= Seiberling =

Seiberling is a surname. Notable people with the surname include:

- Francis Seiberling (1870–1945), American politician
- Frank Seiberling (1859–1955), American businessman
- John F. Seiberling (1918–2008), American politician

It may also refer to:

- Seiberling Rubber Company, founded by Frank Seiberling
