= Richfield Township, Summit County, Ohio =

Township in Ohio, US

- Township
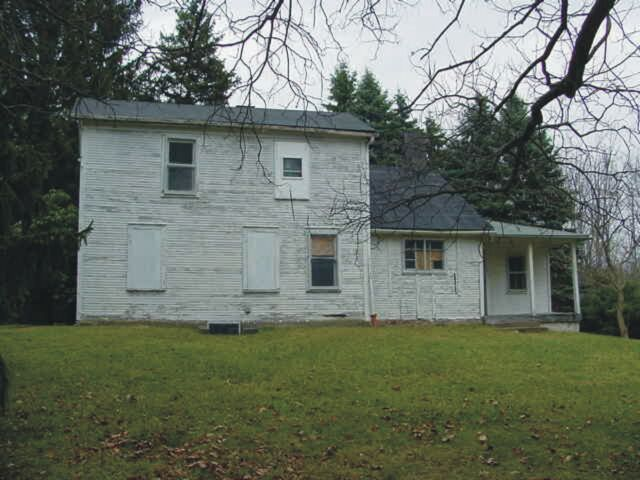
- Albert Cofta Farmhouse

- Location in Summit County and the state of Ohio.
- Coordinates: 41°14′1″N 81°37′56″W
- Country: United States
- State: Ohio
- County: Summit

Area
  - Total: 25.6 sq mi (66.2 km^{2})
  - Land: 25.5 sq mi (66.1 km^{2})
  - Water: 0.039 sq mi (0.1 km^{2})
- Elevation: 1,152 ft (351 m)

Population (2020)
  - Total: 6,437
  - Density: 252/sq mi (97.4/km^{2})
- Time zone: UTC-5 (Eastern (EST))
  - Summer (DST): UTC-4 (EDT)
- ZIP code: 44286
- Area code: 330
- FIPS code: 39-66544
- GNIS feature ID: 1087014
- Website: Richfield Township

Richfield Township is one of the nine townships of Summit County, Ohio, United States. The 2020 census found 6,437 people in the township.

== Geography ==
Located in the northwestern corner of the county, it borders the following townships and cities:

- Brecksville, Cuyahoga County - north
- Boston Township - east
- Bath Township - south
- Granger Township, Medina County - southwest corner
- Hinckley Township, Medina County - west
- Broadview Heights, Cuyahoga County - northwest

The village of Richfield is located in central Richfield Township.

== Name ==
Statewide, other Richfield Townships are located in Henry and Lucas counties. It was given the name Richfield due to the large amount of "Oxbalm" or "rich feed" available to feed cattle.

== History ==
It was formed in survey Town 4, Range 12 in the Connecticut Western Reserve.

From 1974 to 1994, Richfield was the home to the Richfield Coliseum. The Coliseum was home to the Cleveland Cavaliers (NBA), Cleveland Barons (NHL), Cleveland Crusaders (WHA), Cleveland Force (Major Indoor Soccer League) and Cleveland Thunderbolts (Arena Football League). The Coliseum was demolished in 1999.

=== Counties ===
Richfield Township's land has been in the following counties:

Year	County
1796	Wayne
1800	Trumbull
1808	Portage
1811	No county
1812	Medina
1840	Summit

== Demographics ==
=== 2020 census ===
Richfield Township racial composition
Race	Number	Percentage
White (NH)	5,750	89.3%
Black or African American (NH)	113	1.76%
Native American (NH)	3	0.05%
Asian (NH)	181	2.81%
Pacific Islander (NH)	0	0%
Other/mixed	297	4.61%
Hispanic or Latino	93	1.44%

== Government ==
The township is governed by a three-member board of trustees, who are elected in November of odd-numbered years to a four-year term beginning on the following January 1. Two are elected in the year after the presidential election and one is elected in the year before it. There is also an elected township fiscal officer, who serves a four-year term beginning on April 1 of the year after the election, which is held in November of the year before the presidential election. Vacancies in the fiscal officership or on the board of trustees are filled by the remaining trustees.
