= Copley Township, Ohio =

Township in Ohio, US

- Township
- Flag Logo

- Location in Summit County and the state of Ohio.
- Coordinates: 41°6′N 81°38′W
- Country: United States
- State: Ohio
- County: Summit

Area
  - Total: 20.8 sq mi (53.8 km^{2})
  - Land: 20.4 sq mi (52.9 km^{2})
  - Water: 0.35 sq mi (0.9 km^{2})
- Elevation: 1,004 ft (306 m)

Population (2020)
  - Total: 18,403
  - Density: 901/sq mi (347.9/km^{2})
- Time zone: UTC-5 (Eastern (EST))
  - Summer (DST): UTC-4 (EDT)
- ZIP code: 44321
- Area code: 330
- FIPS code
- GNIS feature ID
- Website: Township website

Copley Township is one of the nine townships of Summit County, Ohio, United States. The 2020 census found 18,403 people in the township.

== Geography ==
Located in the western part of the county, it borders the following townships and cities:

- Bath Township - north
- Fairlawn - northeast
- Akron - east
- Norton - south
- Wadsworth Township, Medina County - southwest corner
- Sharon Township, Medina County - west
- Granger Township, Medina County - northwest corner

Several populated places are located in Copley Township:

- The census-designated place of Pigeon Creek, in the northwest
- The unincorporated community of Montrose, on the northern boundary with Bath Township

Parts of the original Copley Township are now in Akron or Fairlawn.

A formerly rural township located west of the county seat of Akron, Copley Township has become increasingly suburban over the last few decades.

== Name and history ==
It is the only Copley Township statewide.

Copley was originally called Greenfield, after Gardiner Green (son-in-law of painter John Singleton Copley), who owned a large portion of the township. Later on he changed the name to Copley, the maiden name of his wife.

On August 7, 2011, a series of shootings occurred in Copley Township which resulted in the deaths of 7 people, and the injury of another. The perpetrator, Michael E. Hance, was shot and killed by rifle by Copley Township police officer Ben Campbell, who received the call while off-duty.

== Economy ==
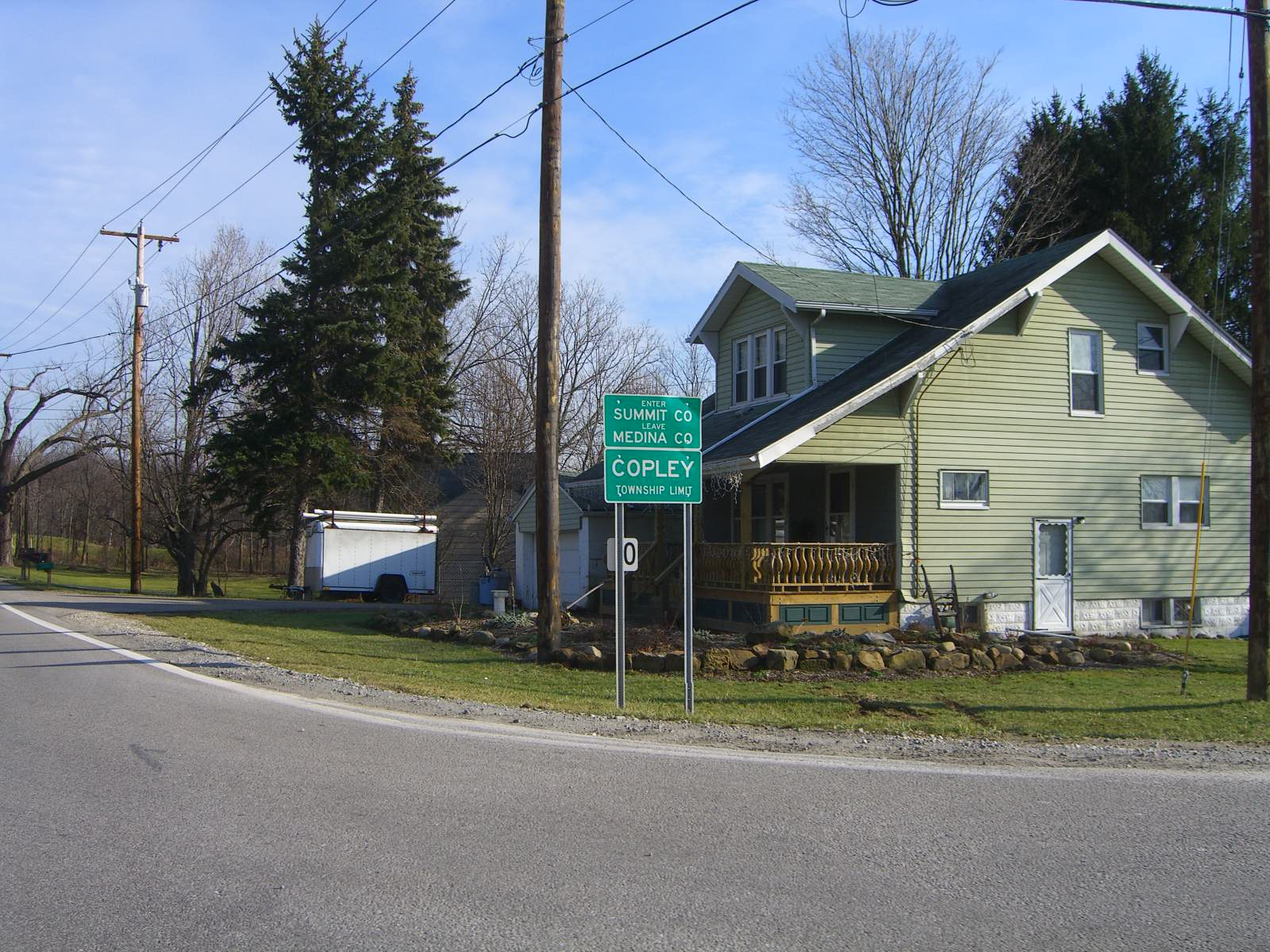
Western border of Copley Township

Copley Township's economy is based on several strip malls, chemical plants, and agricultural businesses. The rest of the township is dotted with farms and subdivisions.

== Government ==
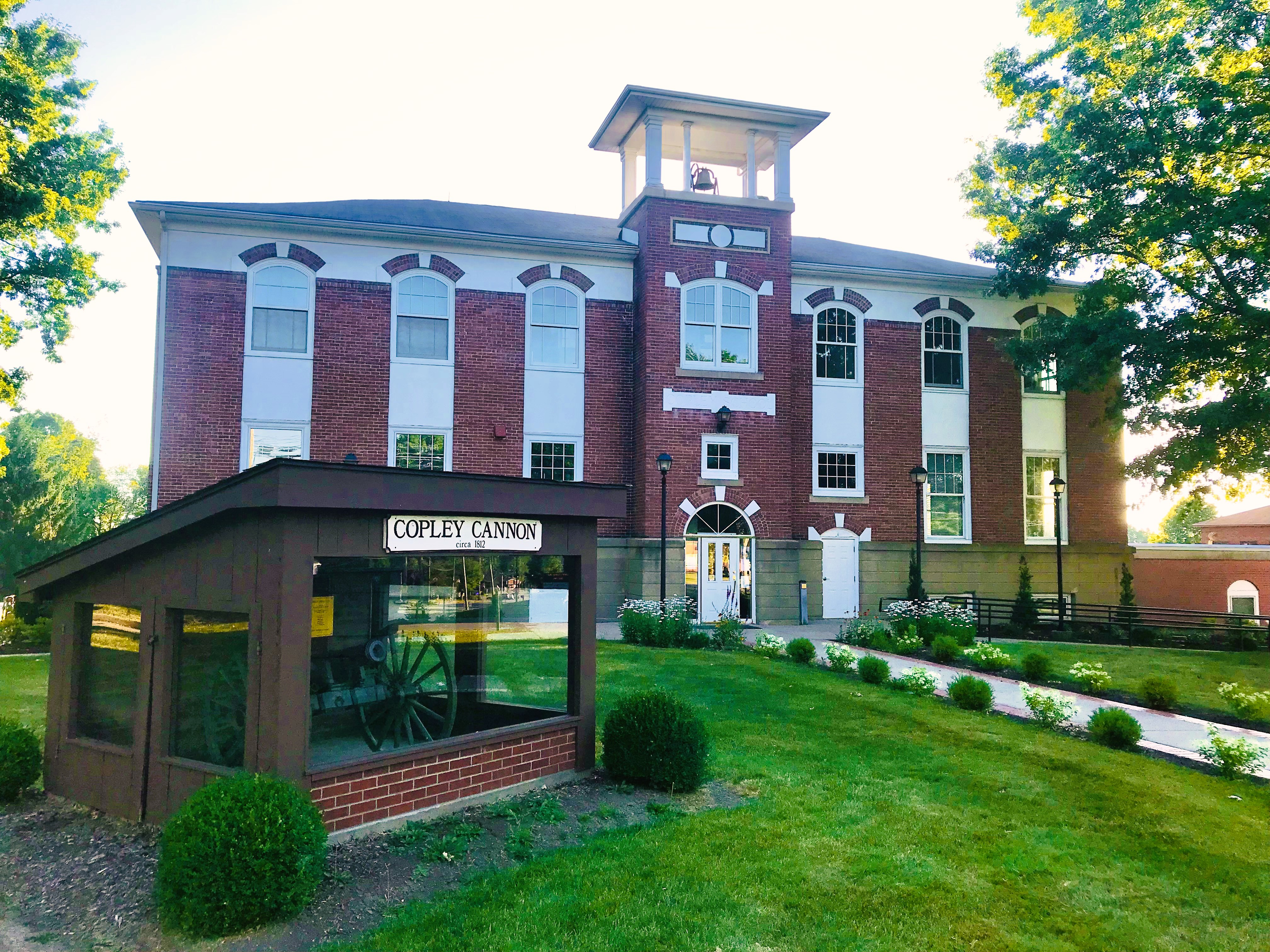
Town Hall in Copley, Ohio

The township is governed by a three-member board of trustees, who are elected in November of odd-numbered years to a four-year term beginning on the following January 1. Two are elected in the year after the presidential election and one is elected in the year before it. There is also an elected township fiscal officer, who serves a four-year term beginning on April 1 of the year after the election, which is held in November of the year before the presidential election. Vacancies in the fiscal officership or on the board of trustees are filled by the remaining trustees.

== Notable people ==
- Carrie Coon, actress
- Jeff Golub, guitarist, musician
- Frank LaRose, Ohio Secretary of State
- John F. Seiberling, U.S. Representative from Ohio
- Betty Sutton, U.S. Representative from Ohio
- Josh Williams, defender for the Columbus Crew

== Education ==
The school system in the township is shared with Fairlawn and has a set of three elementary schools, one middle school, and one high school, Copley High School.

== Superfund ==
In 1990, Copley Square Plaza was designated a superfund site after tetrachloroethylene and other contaminants from a dry cleaning operation were found in the soil.
