= Sharon Township, Medina County, Ohio =

Township in Ohio, US

- Township
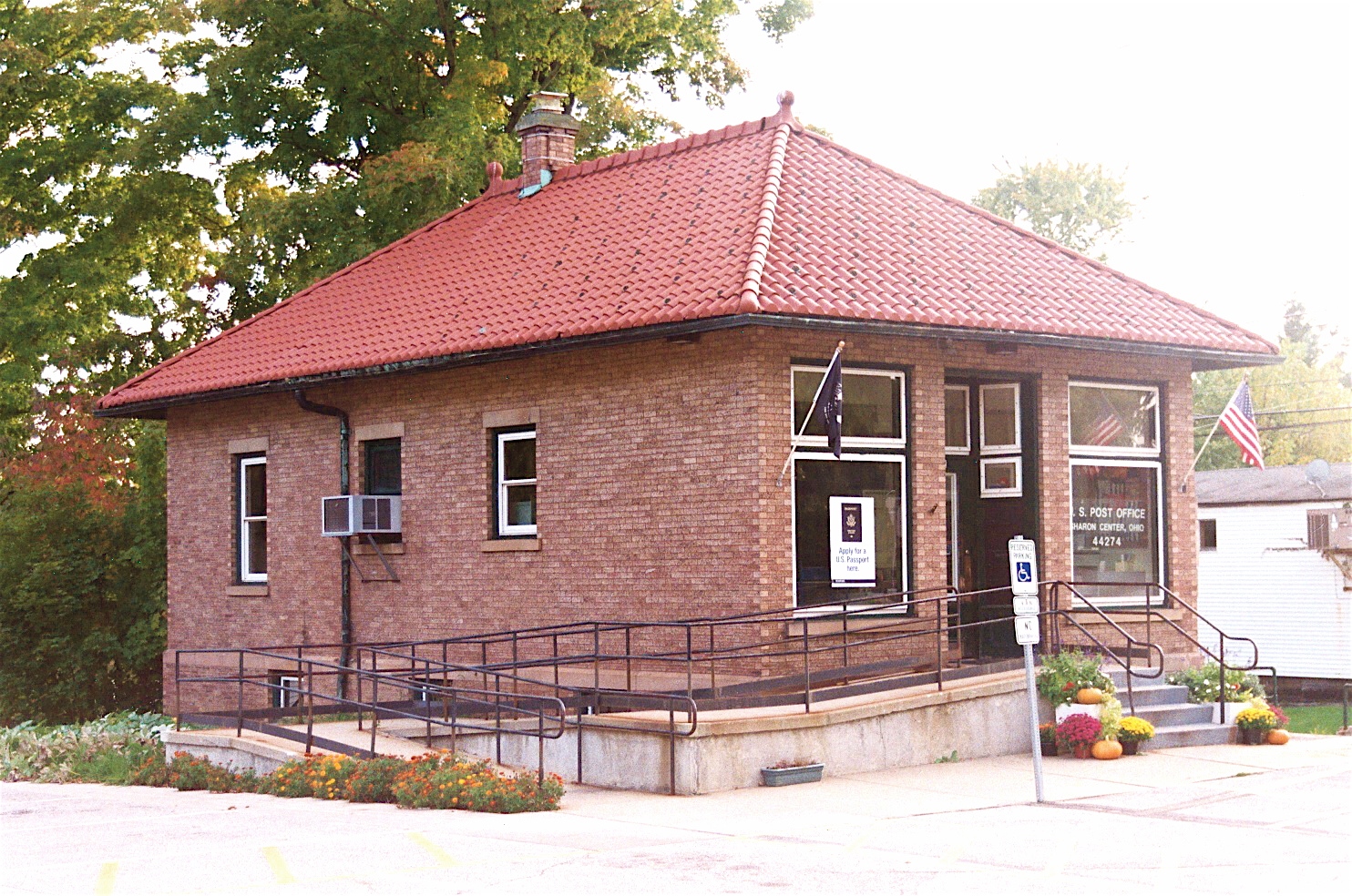
- Sharon Center post office

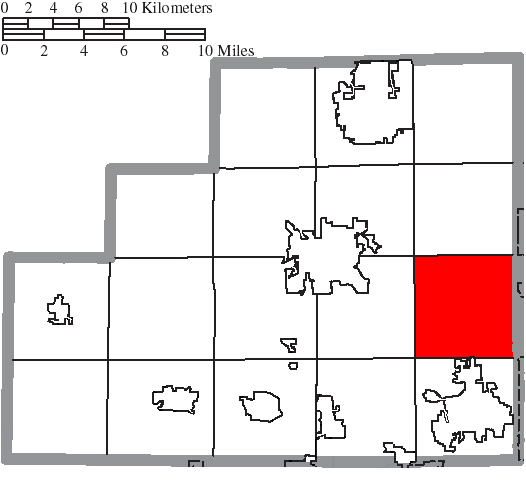
- Location of Sharon Township in Medina County
- Coordinates: 41°6′N 81°44′W
- Country: United States
- State: Ohio
- County: Medina

Area
  - Total: 26.1 sq mi (67.5 km^{2})
  - Land: 26.1 sq mi (67.5 km^{2})
  - Water: 0.039 sq mi (0.1 km^{2})
- Elevation: 1,040 ft (317 m)

Population (2020)
  - Total: 5,966
  - Density: 229/sq mi (88.4/km^{2})
- Time zone: UTC-5 (Eastern (EST))
  - Summer (DST): UTC-4 (EDT)
- FIPS code: 39-71801
- GNIS feature ID: 1086603

Sharon Township is one of the seventeen townships of Medina County, Ohio, United States. The 2020 census found 5,966 people in the township.

== Geography ==
Located in the east part of the county, it borders the following townships and city:

- Granger Township - north
- Bath Township, Summit County - northeast corner
- Copley Township, Summit County - east
- Norton - southeast corner
- Wadsworth Township - south
- Guilford Township - southwest corner
- Montville Township - west
- Medina Township - northwest corner

A small part of the city of Wadsworth is located in southern Sharon Township. The census-designated place of Sharon Center is located in the center of the township.

== Name and history ==
Statewide, other Sharon Townships are located in Franklin, Noble, and Richland counties.

== Government ==
The township is governed by a three-member board of trustees, who are elected in November of odd-numbered years to a four-year term beginning on the following January 1. Two are elected in the year after the presidential election and one is elected in the year before it. There is also an elected township fiscal officer, who serves a four-year term beginning on April 1 of the year after the election, which is held in November of the year before the presidential election. Vacancies in the fiscal officership or on the board of trustees are filled by the remaining trustees.

== Public services ==
Public safety in Sharon Township is the responsibility of the Medina County Sheriff's Office and the Sharon Township Fire Department.

Addresses in Sharon Township are served by either the Wadsworth city post office or the Medina city post office.
