= Seiberling Rubber Company =

American tire manufacturer (1921–1965)

- Company type: Subsidiary
- Industry: Manufacturing
- Founded: 1921 Barberton, Ohio, United States
- Founder: Frank Seiberling
- Fate: Acquired by Firestone in 1965; Passed to Bridgestone control in 1988 when the latter bought Firestone
- Headquarters: Akron, Ohio (formerly) Nashville, Tennessee, United States
- Area served: Costa Rica Worldwide (formerly)
- Key people: Frank Seiberling, Charles Seiberling
- Products: Tires
- Owner: Bridgestone
- Parent: Firestone Tire and Rubber Company
- Website: http://seiberling.co.cr/en

The Seiberling Rubber Company was an American tire manufacturer for motor vehicles. Founded in 1921 by Frank Seiberling, the founder of the Goodyear Tire and Rubber Company, it was acquired by Firestone Tire and Rubber Company in 1965.

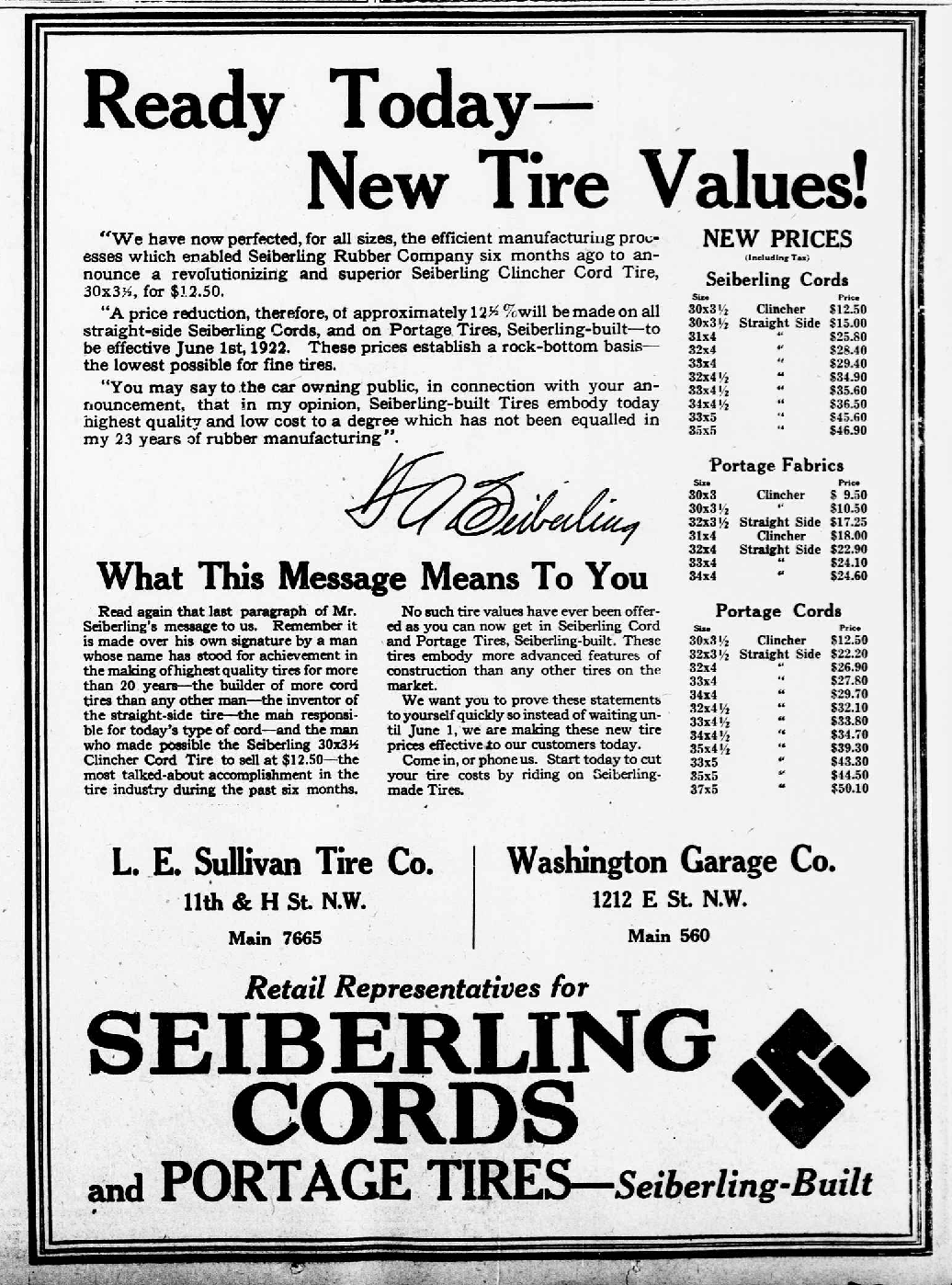
Seiberling Tires ad from 1922.

== History ==
In 1898 Frank A. Seiberling acquired an old strawboard factory in Akron, Ohio and founded the Goodyear Tire & Rubber Company (naming it after Charles Goodyear, the inventor of vulcanized rubber). He served as the company's president for 15 years when, in 1921 the company was refinanced and reorganized. Frank A. Seiberling and his brother Charles resigned from the company and founded a rubber and tire company bearing his name.

The Seiberling Rubber Company was founded in 1921 in Barberton, Ohio. In only six years Seiberling rose from 330th to 7th place in the tire industry. During World War II, Seiberling supplied tires for heavy artillery pieces. Seiberling is also credited for inventing the Saw-Tooth Tread and the tire Heat-Vents.

Seiberling Tire's advertising in the 1940´s through the 1950´s was famous for the brand's slogan of "A name you can trust in Rubber."

In the mid-1960´s, Seiberling launched the SuperWideSport series, a bias-belted tire aimed to the Muscle Car market, booming at the time. The tire featured a whitewall on one side and a redline on the other, also common on the tire market at the time. The tire achieved relatively good sales being that Seiberling's Akron rivals had released good products to compete, including Goodyear's Polyglas, Firestone's Wide-Oval, Uniroyal's Tiger Paw, Atlas Plycron 2plus2 and BFGoodrich's Radial T/A. The tire success did not go unnoticed and by the early-1970s the Big Three had some Seiberlings as original equipment fitted on their cars.

Despite its commercial success and early achievements, Seiberling failed to adapt and catch up with the market changes, especially with the arrival of foreign companies who were quick to introduce the radial tire.

The company was acquired in 1965 by the Firestone Tire and Rubber Company, ultimately belonging to Bridgestone when the latter took over Firestone. Seiberling tires are no longer sold in the US market, but the brand name is still in use in some countries. Manufactured at Firestone's plants, they are aimed to the budget-oriented consumer in selected sizes.

== See also ==
- Frank Seiberling
- Seiberling Mansion
- Bridgestone
- Firestone Tire and Rubber Company
- Dayton Tires
- Tire manufacturing
- List of tire companies
- Stan Hywet Hall and Gardens
