= Hinckley Township, Medina County, Ohio =

Township in Ohio, US

- Township
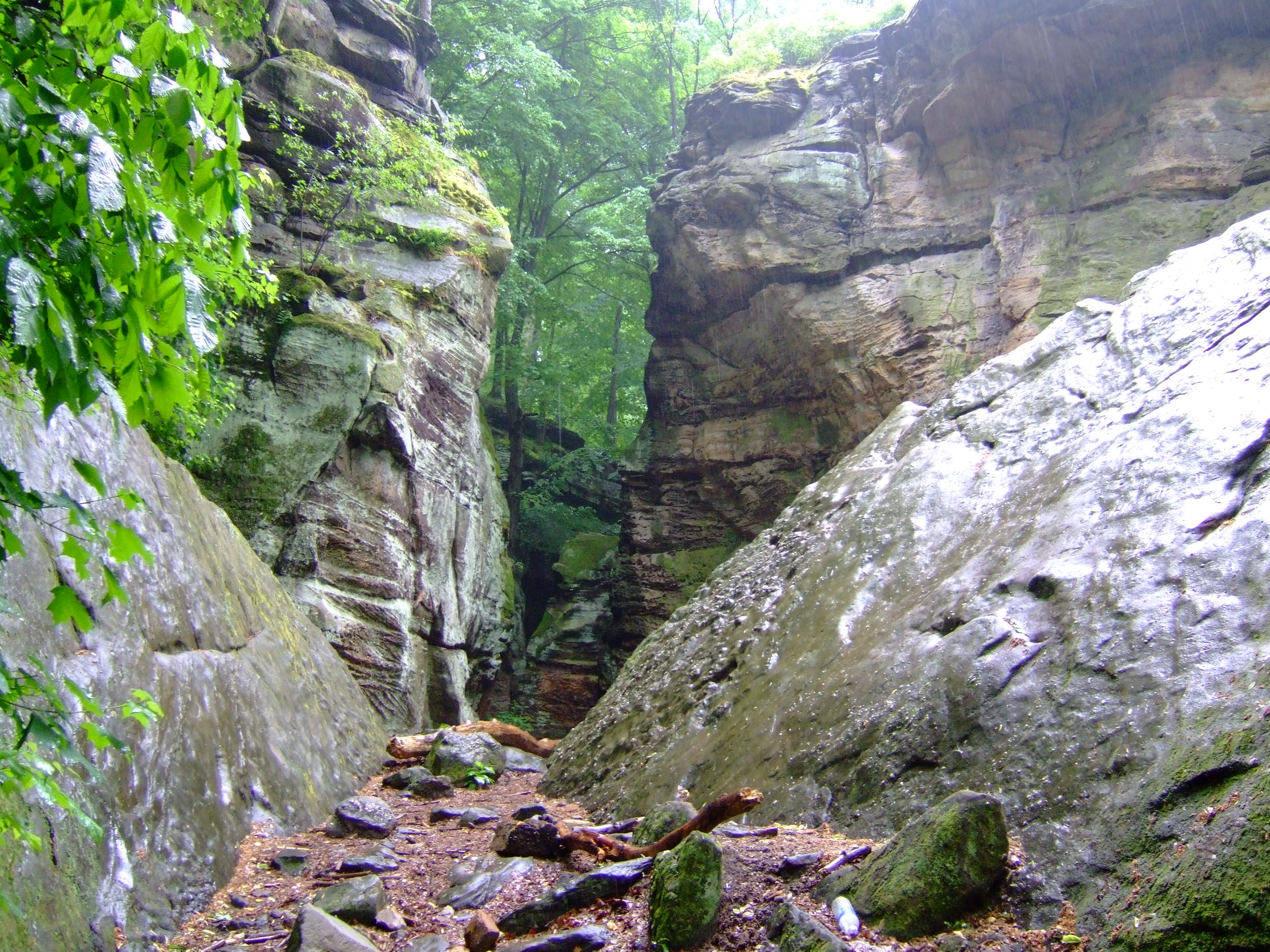
- Stone formations at the Hinckley Reservation

- Flag
- Motto(s): "Small Town, Big Hearts"
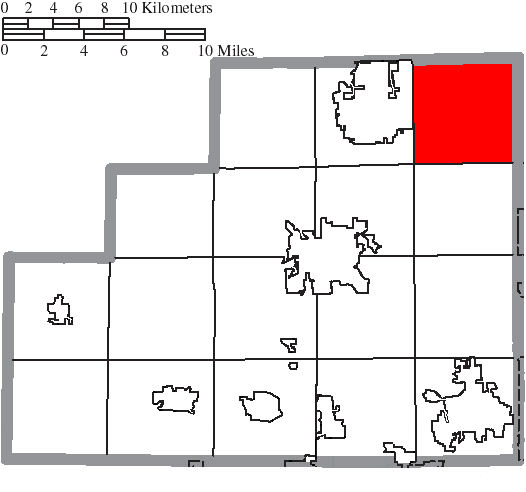
- Location of Hinckley Township in Medina County
- Coordinates: 41°14′31″N 81°44′8″W
- Country: United States
- State: Ohio
- County: Medina

Area
  - Total: 26.9 sq mi (69.6 km^{2})
  - Land: 26.7 sq mi (69.2 km^{2})
  - Water: 0.15 sq mi (0.4 km^{2})
- Elevation: 1,033 ft (315 m)

Population (2020)
  - Total: 8,025
  - Density: 300/sq mi (116/km^{2})
- Time zone: UTC-5 (Eastern (EST))
  - Summer (DST): UTC-4 (EDT)
- ZIP code: 44233
- Area code: 330
- FIPS code: 39-35644
- GNIS feature ID: 1086595

Hinckley Township is one of the seventeen townships of Medina County, Ohio, United States, located in the northeast corner of the county. The 2020 census found 8,025 people in the township.

== Geography ==
Located in the northeast corner of the county, it borders the following townships and cities:

- North Royalton, Cuyahoga County - north
- Broadview Heights, Cuyahoga County - northeast
- Richfield Township, Summit County - east
- Bath Township, Summit County - southeast corner
- Granger Township - south
- Medina Township - southwest corner
- Brunswick - west
- Brunswick Hills Township - west

No municipalities are located in Hinckley Township.

== Name and history ==
Hinckley Township was established in 1825. Named for Samuel Hinckley, the original proprietor, it is the only Hinckley Township statewide.

== Buzzards ==
The township became known across Ohio and the United States as the home of the buzzards. On March 15 of every year, buzzards arrive in large flocks at the town, as if on a very exact biological clock. The town began celebrating the arrival of the birds in 1957, and today as many as 50,000 visitors visit the Hinckley Reservation of the Cleveland Metroparks in the town annually on "Buzzard Day" to witness the return of the avian residents. The event is used to mark the beginning of spring for Hinckley and the surrounding towns.

== Government ==
The township is governed by a three-member board of trustees, who are elected in November of odd-numbered years to a four-year term beginning on the following January 1. Two are elected in the year after the presidential election and one is elected in the year before it. There is also an elected township fiscal officer, who serves a four-year term beginning on April 1 of the year after the election, which is held in November of the year before the presidential election. Vacancies in the fiscal officer position or on the board of trustees are filled by the remaining trustees.

== Notable residents ==
- Connor Cook — NFL quarterback
- Jim Donovan — Cleveland Browns radio play-by-play announcer
- Avery Jenkins — professional disc golfer, 2009 PDGA World Champion
- Valarie Jenkins — professional disc golfer, four-time PDGA World Champion
- Dominique Moceanu — USA Olympic gymnast
- Luke Raley - outfielder for Seattle Mariners
- Matt Tifft — NASCAR driver
