= 2011 Copley Township shooting =

Mass shooting in Ohio, U.S.

- Copley Township (Ohio)
- Location: 41.09°N 81.6052°W; Copley Township, Ohio, U.S.
- Date: August 7, 2011; 10:55 – 11:05 a.m. EST (UTC-05:00)
- Attack type: Mass shooting
- Weapons: Hi-Point Model JHP .45-caliber pistol; Smith & Wesson Model 586 .357 Magnum revolver
- Deaths: 8 (including the perpetrator)
- Injuries: 1
- Perpetrator: Michael E. Hance
- Defender: Ben Campbell
- Motive: Unclear

On August 7, 2011, a mass shooting occurred in Copley Township, Ohio, committed by 51-year-old Michael E. Hance. Seven people were shot dead before the gunman was shot and killed by Copley police officer Ben Campbell. Hance had previously displayed erratic and bizarre behavior, and was considered by those who knew him to be delusional. Campbell later received the Law Enforcement Congressional Badge of Bravery for taking down Hance.

== Shooting ==
Using two handguns, including a Hi-Point Model JHP .45-caliber pistol and a blue-steel Smith & Wesson Model 586 .357 Magnum six-shot revolver he bought from the same location in 2005, Hance opened fire at a house in the 2300 block of Goodenough Avenue. He first shot his 49-year-old girlfriend Rebecca K. Dieter, who was the only survivor in the shooting. Dieter managed to call 9-1-1 before escaping to the porch of her house and being shot again in the back, after which she pretended to be dead.

He then ran into an adjacent house, where he shot and killed Dieter's brother Craig; Autumn Johnson, 16; her grandparents, Russell Johnson, 67, and Gudrun Johnson, 64; and Amelia Shambaugh, 16, who was visiting a friend at the time and was seated in her parked car when she was shot. Hance then chased Autumn Johnson's father, 44-year-old Bryan Johnson, northward, and shot him to death in a nearby driveway on Schocalog Road.

He next followed Craig's son, 11-year-old Scott, into a house on the same street. There, Hance found Scott hiding behind a furnace in the basement with the home's current residents, Melonie Bagley and her three children (nine-year-old Dae'Shawn, three-year-old Destany, and a one-year-old daughter). Bagley tried to deny that Scott was with her before fleeing with her daughters. Hance found Scott and Dae'Shawn, shooting and killing the former while leaving the Bagley family alive.

As Hance was leaving the house, Officer Ben Campbell, along with former Copley Township policeman Keith Lavery, spotted him. Together, they issued commands telling him to drop his weapon and get on the ground, which Hance ignored, raising his gun instead, firing shots at them. In response, Campbell and Lavery shot at Hance, with rounds from Campbell's rifle ultimately killing Hance.

== Perpetrator ==
Michael Hance

Michael E. Hance, a 51-year-old male, was identified as the gunman in the shooting. He was described as extremely helpful, but also quiet, strange, eccentric and "not well-liked" by residents of Copley Township. Acquaintances stated that he had "compulsions" that seemed to hint at a previously undiagnosed mental illness. He graduated from Norton High School in 1978, and was voted the "most courteous" student in the class. His only experience with mental healthcare was through herbal remedies. His girlfriend later described him as having no violent tendencies, but stated that he was depressed and had had trouble sleeping. However, he was described as delusional and displayed bizarre behavior, such as removing all the batteries in the clocks in the house, saying the ticking noise "bothered him".

In 1997, Hance contacted police about a man threatening him with a gun when he went out to confront him for vandalizing his truck. He had recently been forced to care for Dieter's father, who was suffering from dementia, and lost his job at a copy store after it was closed down. He was also having tense relations with Russell and Gudrun Johnson, who were his next-door neighbors. On one occasion, he was told by Gudrun to clean up his property, only for her to be forced away by him.

Hance had in the lead up to the shooting sought out repayment of a debt that he had previously forgiven, when he had previously been unmotivated by money. He used the money to buy the guns used in the shooting from Sydmor's Jewelry in neighboring Barberton, Ohio five days before, as well as a holster and roughly 200 rounds of ammunition. He visited a local gun range several times in the lead up to the shooting.

The day before the shooting he had visited family with his girlfriend. Relatives noted that he had appeared "agitated", and that Hance had glared at Scott Dieter. The Copley Chief of Police, Michael Mier, stated that Hance may have been planning a shooting in Cleveland or Pennsylvania, and Craig Dieter, the first victim, had noticed his guns. In his theory, the Johnsons were collateral damage.

== Aftermath ==
Ben Campbell was one of 34 police officers presented the Top Cops award by President Barack Obama in May 2012, and later received the Law Enforcement Congressional Badge of Bravery in March 2013 for taking down Hance. On the anniversary of the shooting a year later, a memorial was held in remembrance of the victims. Flags in the community were hung at half-staff.

The only survivor, Hance's girlfriend, stated in August 2019, in the aftermath of the 2019 El Paso Walmart shooting and the 2019 Dayton shooting, that she still believed in the rights of the Second Amendment, but that she supported the proposal of a red flag law, even though she did not believe it would have stopped the shooting. She stated she believed Hance was suffering from a type of delusional disorder and was psychotic at the time.

Gun rights advocate Massad Ayoob, writing for American Handgunner, argued that the response to the shooting was courageous on part of the police, and that the contribution of armed citizen Keith Lavery in taking down Hance was ignored by the media, which he called "disgraceful". Gun control advocate Tom Diaz argued in his book The Last Gun that the shooting was "quintessentially American", and that the media response to the shooting exemplified a "breathless but ultimately feckless" type of media reporting after mass shootings.
