= Guilford Township, Medina County, Ohio =

Township in Ohio, US

- Township
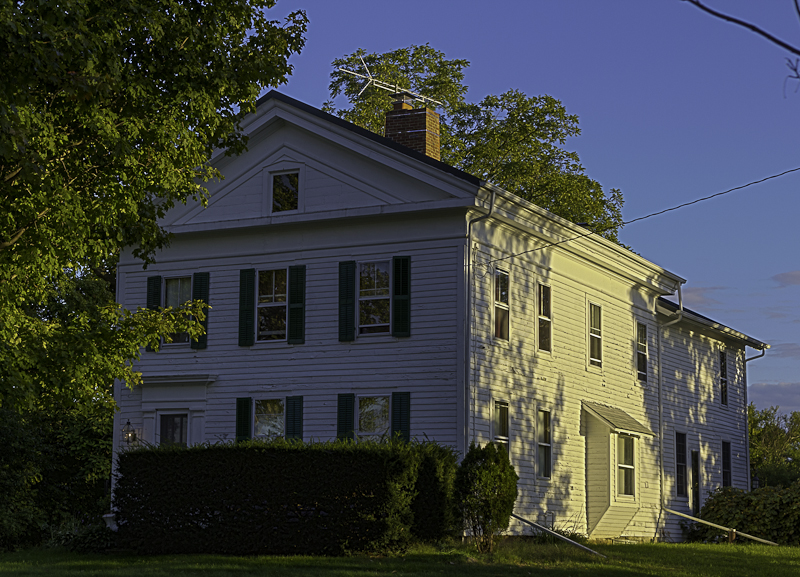
- Halsey Hulburt Homestead

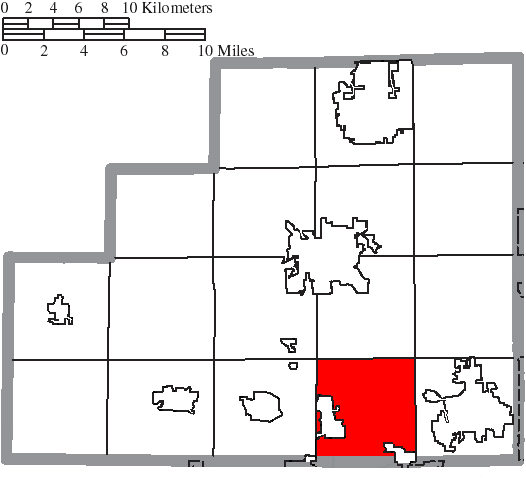
- Location of Guilford Township in Medina County
- Coordinates: 41°1′2″N 81°50′28″W
- Country: United States
- State: Ohio
- County: Medina

Area
  - Total: 25.1 sq mi (65.0 km^{2})
  - Land: 25.1 sq mi (65.0 km^{2})
  - Water: 0 sq mi (0.0 km^{2})
- Elevation: 1,142 ft (348 m)

Population (2020)
  - Total: 3,076
  - Density: 123/sq mi (47.3/km^{2})
- Time zone: UTC-5 (Eastern (EST))
  - Summer (DST): UTC-4 (EDT)
- ZIP code: 44273
- Area code: 330
- FIPS code: 39-32676
- GNIS feature ID: 1086593
- Website: https://www.guilfordtownship.us/

Guilford Township is one of the seventeen townships of Medina County, Ohio, United States. With the Village of Seville and territory ceded to the City of Rittman for the Western Reserve National Cemetery, it encompasses an area of about twenty-five square miles. The 2020 census found 3,076 people in the township.

== Geography ==
Located in the southern part of the county, it borders the following townships:

- Montville Township - north
- Sharon Township - northeast corner
- Wadsworth Township - east
- Milton Township, Wayne County - south
- Canaan Township, Wayne County - southwest corner
- Westfield Township - west
- Lafayette Township - northwest corner

Two municipalities are located in Guilford Township: part of the city of Rittman in the southeast, and the village of Seville in the west.

== Name and history ==
It is the only Guilford Township statewide. Derived from Guilford, Connecticut; a place from which the area’s original white settlers came from.

== Government ==
The township is governed by a three-member board of trustees, who are elected in November of odd-numbered years to a four-year term beginning on the following January 1. Two are elected in the year after the presidential election and one is elected in the year before it. There is also an elected township fiscal officer, who serves a four-year term beginning on April 1 of the year after the election, which is held in November of the year before the presidential election. Vacancies in the fiscal officership or on the board of trustees are filled by the remaining trustees.
