= Medina Township, Medina County, Ohio =

Township in Ohio, US

- Township
- Flag Logo

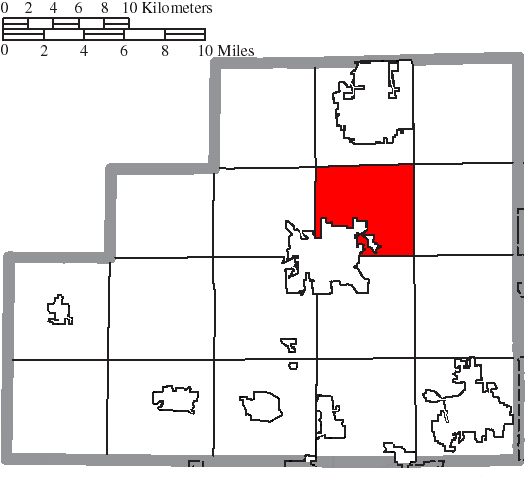
- Location of Medina Township in Medina County
- Coordinates: (41.1711013, -81.8287763)
- Country: United States
- State: Ohio
- County: Medina

Area
  - Total: 18.1 sq mi (46.8 km^{2})
  - Land: 18.0 sq mi (46.6 km^{2})
  - Water: 0.077 sq mi (0.2 km^{2})
- Elevation: 1,014 ft (309 m)

Population (2020)
  - Total: 9,183
  - Density: 510/sq mi (197/km^{2})
- Time zone: UTC-5 (Eastern (EST))
  - Summer (DST): UTC-4 (EDT)
- ZIP codes: 44215, 44256, 44258
- Area code: 330
- FIPS code: 39-48804
- GNIS feature ID: 1086601

Medina Township (/məˈdaɪnə/ mə-DY-nə) is one of the seventeen townships of Medina County, Ohio, United States. The 2020 census found 9,183 people in the township.

== Geography ==
Located in the central part of the county, it borders the following townships:

- Brunswick Hills Township - north
- Hinckley Township - northeast corner
- Granger Township - east
- Sharon Township - southeast corner
- Montville Township - south
- Lafayette Township - southwest corner
- York Township - west
- Liverpool Township - northwest corner

The city of Medina, the county seat, borders the township to the southwest.

== Name and history ==
The township derives its name from Medina, in Arabia. The original name for the Township was to be Mecca, but was changed after a dispute among early settlers. It is the only Medina Township statewide. The township is attributed as being the oldest organized government in Medina County. Land from the township was included when the village of Medina was incorporated in 1818.

== Government ==
The township is governed by a three-member board of trustees, who are elected in November of odd-numbered years to a four-year term beginning on the following January 1. Two are elected in the year after the presidential election and one is elected in the year before it. There is also an elected township fiscal officer, who serves a four-year term beginning on April 1 of the year after the election, which is held in November of the year before the presidential election. Vacancies in the fiscal officership or on the board of trustees are filled by the remaining trustees.

The township employs its own police force and contracts with the City of Medina for Fire and EMS services. The Township is also in charge of maintaining and operating four cemeteries. These cemeteries are: Weymouth, Hamilton Corners, Remsen, and Medina Center Cemetery. The only operational cemetery is Medina Center Cemetery.
