= Granger Township, Medina County, Ohio =

Township in Ohio, US

- Township
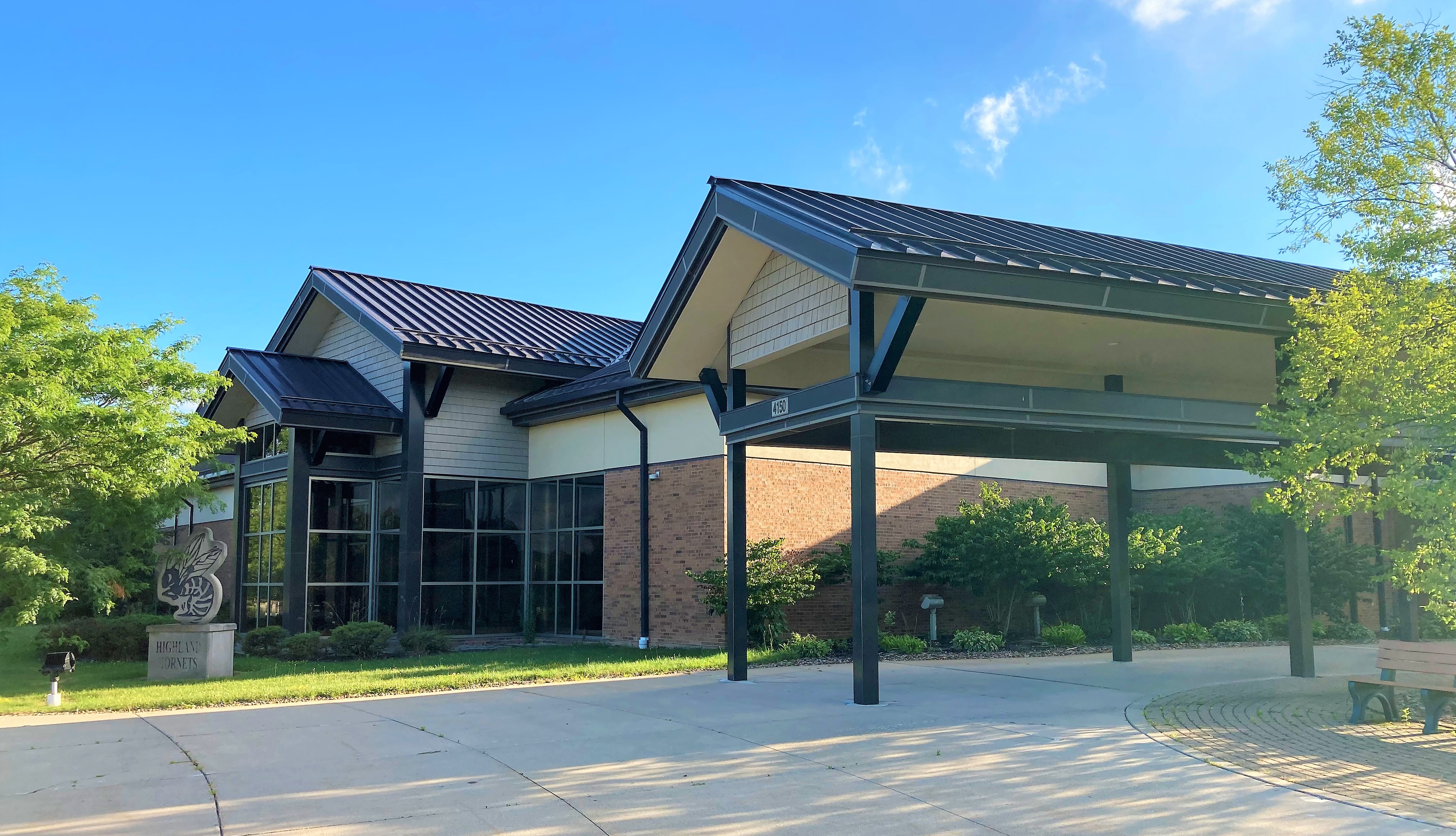
- Highland High School in Granger Township

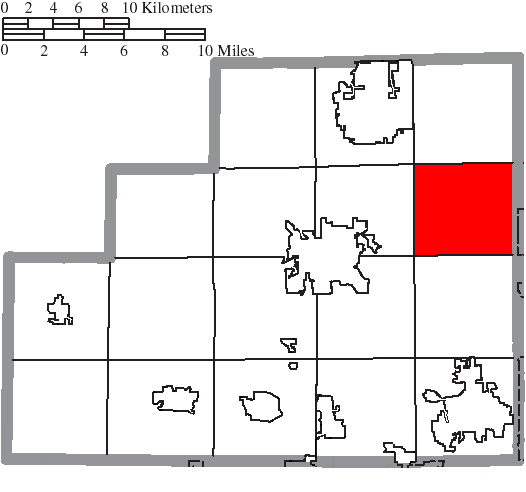
- Location of Granger Township in Medina County
- Coordinates: 41°10′2″N 81°44′20″W
- Country: United States
- State: Ohio
- County: Medina

Area
  - Total: 23.4 sq mi (60.6 km^{2})
  - Land: 23.3 sq mi (60.4 km^{2})
  - Water: 0.077 sq mi (0.2 km^{2})
- Elevation: 1,138 ft (347 m)

Population (2020)
  - Total: 4,556
  - Density: 195/sq mi (75.4/km^{2})
- Time zone: UTC-5 (Eastern (EST))
  - Summer (DST): UTC-4 (EDT)
- FIPS code: 39-31374
- GNIS feature ID: 1086592
- Website: http://www.grangertwp.org/

Granger Township is one of the seventeen townships of Medina County, Ohio, United States. The 2020 census found 4,556 people in the township.

== Geography ==
Located in the east part of the county, it borders the following townships:

- Hinckley Township - north
- Richfield Township, Summit County - northeast corner
- Bath Township, Summit County - east
- Copley Township, Summit County - southeast corner
- Sharon Township - south
- Montville Township - southwest corner
- Medina Township - west
- Brunswick Hills Township - northwest corner

No municipalities are located in Granger Township.

== Name and history ==
Granger Township was organized in 1820, and named for Gideon Granger, a member of the Connecticut House of Representatives and 4th United States Postmaster General. The name was selected per a popular vote. It is the only Granger Township statewide.

== Government ==
The township is governed by a three-member board of trustees, who are elected in November of odd-numbered years to a four-year term beginning on the following January 1. Two are elected in the year after the presidential election and one is elected in the year before it. There is also an elected township fiscal officer, who serves a four-year term beginning on April 1 of the year after the election, which is held in November of the year before the presidential election. Vacancies in the fiscal officership or on the board of trustees are filled by the remaining trustees.
