= Henrietta Buckler Seiberling =

American Christian activist (1888–1979)

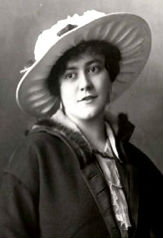
- Born: March 18, 1888; Lawrenceburg, Kentucky, US
- Died: December 5, 1979 (aged 91); New York City, US
- Education: Vassar College

Henrietta McBrayer Buckler Seiberling (March 18, 1888 – December 5, 1979) became the daughter-in-law of Goodyear Tire co-founder Frank Seiberling, when she married her husband Frederick Seiberling. Together they were known because their son John became a U.S. Congressman from Ohio. On her own, Henrietta became well known because she connected Alcoholics Anonymous's co-founders, Bill W. and Dr. Bob, an Akron-based doctor. She was an active member of a Christian fellowship group named the Oxford Group.

== Early life ==
Born in Lawrenceburg, Kentucky to Judge Julius A. and Mary Maddox Buckler, Seiberling spent her childhood in El Paso and San Antonio, Texas. A gifted pianist, she attend Vassar College where she earned an A.B. degree with a major in music and a minor in psychology. She met John Fredrick "Fred" Seiberling, a lieutenant in the Ohio National Guard, while he was deployed to El Paso. The couple married in 1917 in Akron, Ohio, and had three children.

== Career ==
Though Seiberling herself was not an alcoholic, she believed as a Christian that it was her responsibility to solve social problems. Seiberling began the “alcoholic squad" of the local Akron-based Oxford Group. In their first case, Dr. Bob Smith admitted that he was a secret drinker, marking the first time the Akron Oxford Group prayed together to help someone through alcoholism. Although the majority of the Seiberling family were members at a Lutheran church near their house, she was not. Seiberling was more of a "student of the bible," rather than a "church-goer."

As Henrietta and Fredrick Seiberling's marriage was crumbling, Henrietta became more involved with The Oxford Group. Her daughter Dorothy said, "It gave her a new focus, and helped her see that there was more to life than marital problems." Henrietta grew closer to Bob and Anne Smith, and would call Anne everyday to talk about the comfort they both received through the Oxford Group.

In addition to Seiberling's efforts to help sober up Dr. Bob Smith in her Oxford Group, Seiberling became famous in AA history for introducing Bill W. to Dr. Bob. After Bill W. worked with Dr. Bob for a while, Dr. Bob had his last drink on June 10, 1935, a date which became AA's founding date.

Henrietta Seiberling and her husband were devoted supporters of Alcoholics Anonymous, opening their home to its members and also leading meetings of the Oxford Group for those who were interested.

== Personal life ==
Her son, John F. Seiberling, was a Representative in the United States Congress from Ohio and a member of the Democratic party. Seiberling also had 2 daughters, Mary S. Huhn and Dorothy Seiberling Steinberg, who was a deputy editor for the New York Times Magazine.

== Death and legacy ==
Seiberling died in New York City on December 5, 1979. On her gravestone in Lawrenceburg, Kentucky, is an inscription familiar to both the Oxford Group people and to the fellowship of Alcoholics Anonymous: "Let Go and Let God."
