= Montville Township, Medina County, Ohio =

Township in Ohio, US

- Township
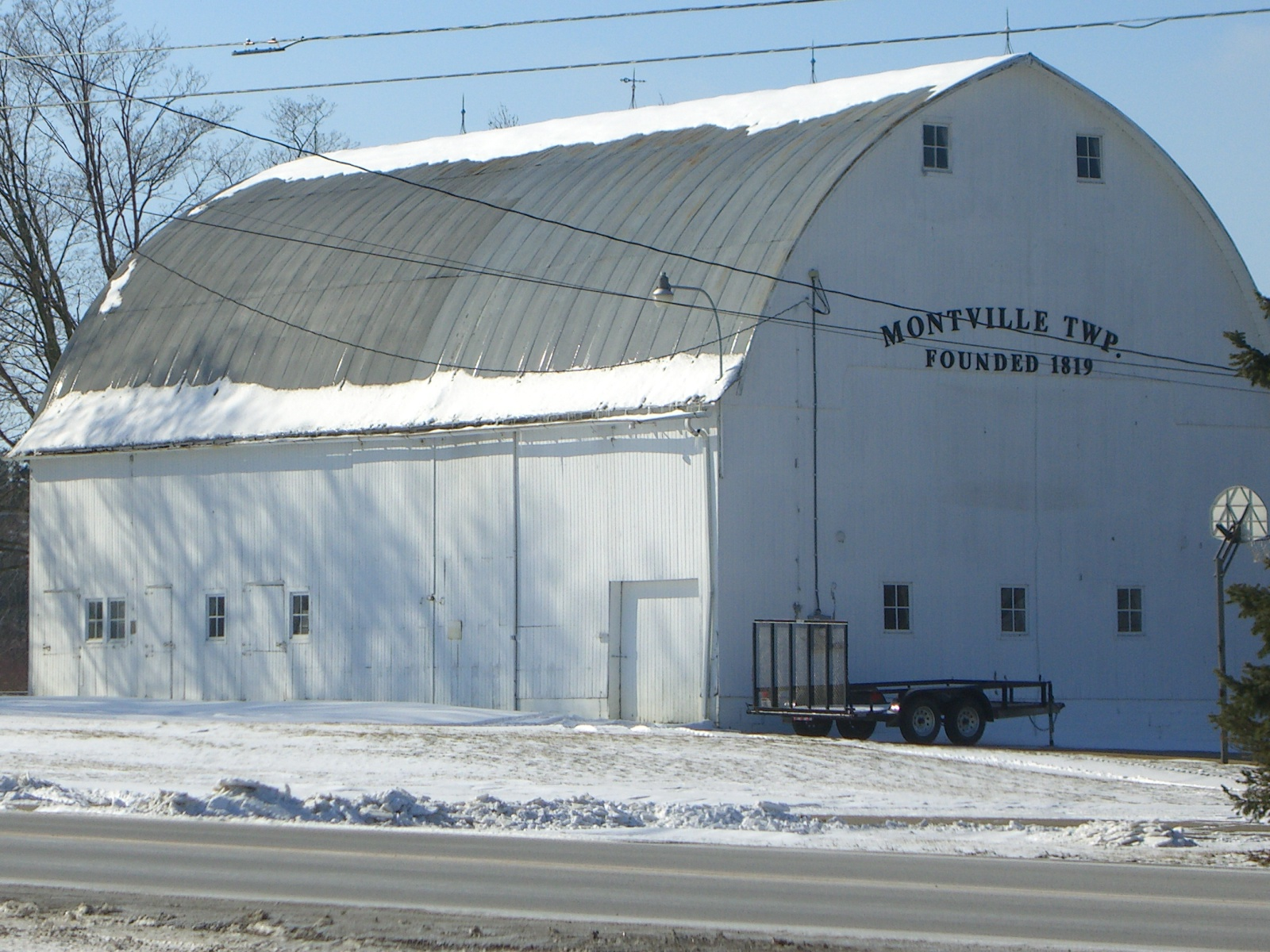
- Barn on State Route 57

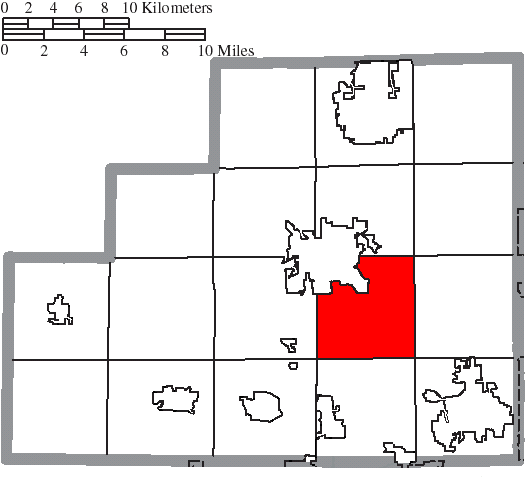
- Location of Montville Township in Medina County
- Coordinates: 41°6′54″N 81°49′18″W
- Country: United States
- State: Ohio
- County: Medina

Area
  - Total: 21.0 sq mi (54.4 km^{2})
  - Land: 20.9 sq mi (54.2 km^{2})
  - Water: 0.077 sq mi (0.2 km^{2})
- Elevation: 965 ft (294 m)

Population (2020)
  - Total: 13,131
  - Density: 627/sq mi (242/km^{2})
- Time zone: UTC-5 (Eastern (EST))
  - Summer (DST): UTC-4 (EDT)
- ZIP code: 44256
- FIPS code: 39-51856
- GNIS feature ID: 1086602

Montville Township is one of the seventeen townships of Medina County, Ohio, United States. The 2020 census found 13,131 people in the township.

== Geography ==
Located in the central part of the county, it borders the following townships:

- Medina Township - north
- Granger Township - northeast corner
- Sharon Township - east
- Wadsworth Township - southeast corner
- Guilford Township - south
- Westfield Township - southwest corner
- Lafayette Township - west
- York Township - northwest corner

Part of the city of Medina, the county seat of Medina County, is located in northwestern Montville Township.

== Name and history ==
Statewide, the only other Montville Township is located in Geauga County.

The land was purchased by General Arisarchus Champion in 1818. He named it after the town in Vermont where he had lived.

The township was established in 1820, less than two years after the first settlers arrived.

== Government ==
The township is governed by a three-member board of trustees, who are elected in November of odd-numbered years to a four-year term beginning on the following January 1. Two are elected in the year after the presidential election and one is elected in the year before it. There is also an elected township fiscal officer, who serves a four-year term beginning on April 1 of the year after the election, which is held in November of the year before the presidential election. Vacancies in the fiscal officership or on the board of trustees are filled by the remaining trustees. As of 2012, Ronald Bischof, Jeff Bradon, and Sally Albrecht are members of the board of trustees with Bischof serving as chairman and Brandon serving as vice chairman.

Police, fire, and LST personnel operate out of the Ron F. Bischof Safety Services building, which opened in 2011. Other township business operates out of the Montville Administration Building.
