= Frank Seiberling =

American innovator and entrepreneur

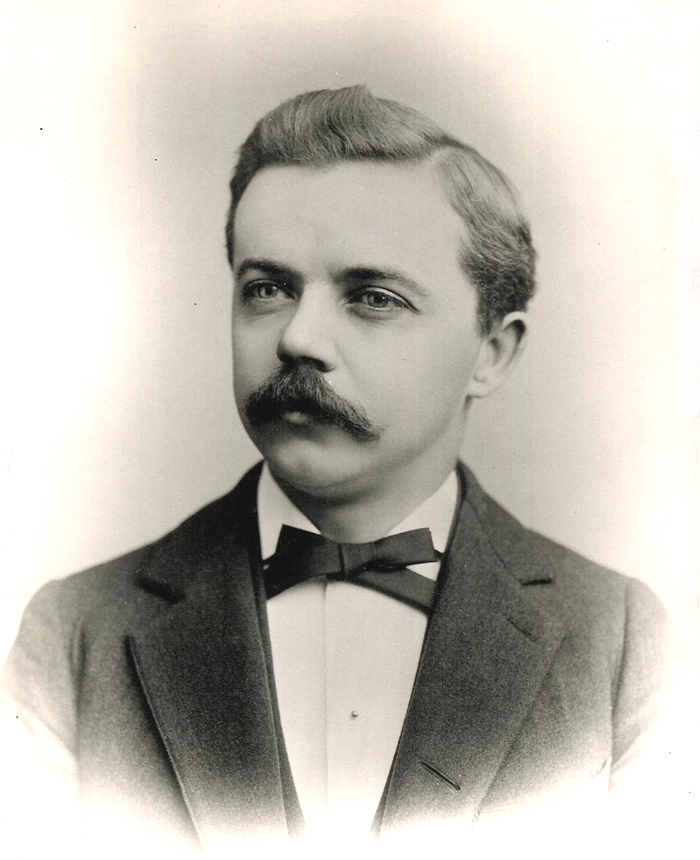
- Seiberling taken sometime before 1900
- Born: Franklin Augustus Seiberling; October 6, 1859; Western Star, Ohio, U.S.
- Died: August 11, 1955 (aged 95); Akron, Ohio, U.S.
- Known for: Co-founder of Goodyear Tire
- Spouse: Gertrude Ferguson Penfield (m. 1887)
- Children: 7

Franklin Augustus Seiberling (October 6, 1859 – August 11, 1955), also known as F.A. Seiberling, was an American innovator and entrepreneur best known for founding the Goodyear Tire & Rubber Company in 1898 and the Seiberling Rubber Company in 1921. He also built Stan Hywet Hall, a Tudor Revival mansion, now a National Historic Landmark and historic house museum in Akron, Ohio.

== Early life ==
Son of a German American entrepreneur from Ohio, Seiberling was born on October 6, 1859, in Western Star (present day Norton), Ohio, a community a few miles southwest of Akron, in Summit County, Ohio. He was the second of nine children born to John Frederick and Catherine Miller Seiberling, where he had one brother and seven sisters.

== Career ==
Seiberling spent two years attending Heidelberg College in Tiffin, Ohio, before joining the J.F. Seiberling Company, his father's farm machinery manufacturing business, working there as secretary and treasurer. His father, John Seiberling, founder of that Akron, Ohio, company, invented one of the first reaping machines. While working for the company, Seiberling invented a twine binder that tied grain bundles with a bow knot.

Many businesses failed in the panics of the 1890s, including the street railway company owned by Seiberling's father. In 1898, Seiberling was jobless, nearing forty years old, with a wife and three children. He learned of the availability of an old strawboard factory in East Akron, which he purchased, together with the 7 acres (28,000 m^{2}) it stood on, for $13,500. He borrowed $3,500 for a down payment from a brother-in-law, Lucius C. Miles. In partnership with his brother C.W. Seiberling, he decided to open a rubber company, picked a name, and was selling stock. The company would be named for Charles Goodyear, the discoverer of vulcanization, who had died penniless almost forty years before.

While Seiberling and his brother Charles were the co-founders of the Goodyear Tire & Rubber Company, its first president was David E. Hill, a business associate who purchased $30,000 of the company's initial stock. In 1899, Raymond C. Penfield, another brother-in-law, became the second president of the company; Lucius C. Miles followed in the position in 1900. In 1906, Seiberling, until then the secretary and general manager, became the fourth president of the company.

Seiberling was credited with 19 patents during his tenure at The Goodyear Tire & Rubber Company. One of his most famous being for the Seiberling State Tire Building machine which was patented in 1908. Invented in collaboration with Goodyear's chief engineer William State, the machine mechanized tire building, which enabled the industry to move away from the cumbersome and time-consuming process of hand building tires. One man could now turn out 60 tires in ten hours as opposed to five tires built by hand. The Seiberling State machine revolutionized tire building and led to an explosion in tire production output.

Seiberling set up a tire building machine in a separate room on the factory floor and provided demonstrations to other tire manufacturers. Goodyear granted 50 licenses on the tire building machine and made an estimated $2,000,000 in royalties. By 1913, over half of the tires made in the U.S. were manufactured on the Seiberling State machine.

Seiberling and Goodyear received additional patents for creating the first universal tire rim, introducing the double diamond all weather tire tread, and inventing a pneumatic truck tire which eventually replaced the industry standard solid truck tire. By 1916, The Goodyear Tire & Rubber Company was the largest tire producer in the world.

Seiberling became known as the "little Napoleon" of the rubber industry because of his small stature and his unremitting determination to succeed. He played a leading role in developing Akron from a small town into the "rubber capital of the world."

In 1921, Goodyear was refinanced and reorganized, and Frank and Charles Seiberling resigned from the company. Frank Seiberling then began the Seiberling Rubber Company in Barberton, Ohio. During his lifetime, Seiberling became famous for his fair treatment of workers. In 1985, he was inducted into the Tire Industry Hall of Fame as a member of its inaugural class.

== Philanthropy ==
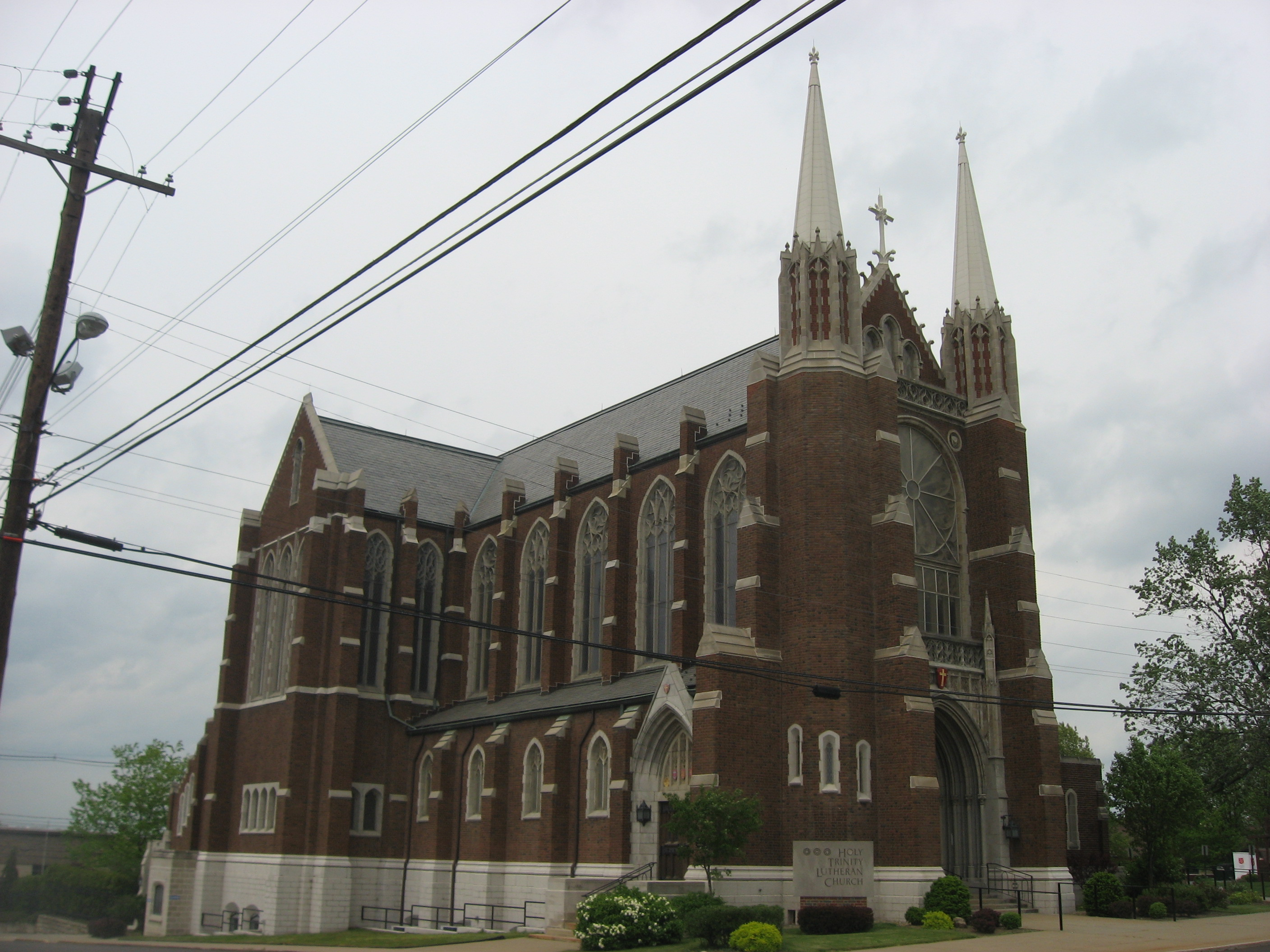
Akron's Holy Trinity Lutheran Church, in which Seiberling was influential

In June 1911, Seiberling announced that he was financing an attempt at a transatlantic airship flight, to be headed by Melvin Vaniman. In July 1912, the airship Akron exploded, and Vaniman and his crew were killed.

During his lifetime, Seiberling used his fortune and influence to create fair housing, build a hospital, improve transportation both locally and nationally, preserve green space for the community's enjoyment and fund countless arts and culture programs and organizations. Seiberling believed true prosperity was gained through the enlightenment and improvement of every citizen. A 1937 Akron Beacon Journal editorial, opined, "One reason we all like the Seiberlings is because they never went 'high hat' on Akron; perhaps no other local family ever enjoyed greater prosperity and achievement . . . yet they were never so busy as to turn a disinterested ear to any pleader for Akron's future or civic welfare . . . No man in Akron ever had a broader conception of Akron's civic problems than Frank Seiberling."

Seiberling focused on projects that directly impacted the lives of his Goodyear employees and thereby ensured the success of Akron. He developed and underwrote the creation of Goodyear Heights, a neighborhood for factory workers; and Fairlawn Heights, a neighborhood for white-collar employees. In addition, he was a founder of The Peoples Hospital, the Fairlawn Country Club, and the Metropolitan Park system in Akron. Seiberling also supported four educational institutions, his alma mater Heidelberg College, the University of Akron, Lincoln Memorial University in Cumberland Gap, Tennessee and the Western Reserve Academy a private boys school in Hudson, Ohio.

He was also involved in the following organizations:

- Akron Chamber of Commerce – President 1910–1911, Member 1910-1955
- Goodyear Heights Phase I – Developer 1910
- Akron Settlement Association – Founding Member 1911, Trustee 1912-1914
- Sumner Homes for the Aged – Founding Member 1911, Trustee 1911-1955
- Buchtel College (now University of Akron) – Trustee 1911-1914
- Akron Institute for the Blind – Founding Member 1912
- Charity Organization Society – Founding Member 1912, President 1912-1913
- Trinity Lutheran Church – Donor of Rebuilding Fund 1913
- Lincoln Highway Association – Founding Member 1913, President 1918-1921
- Heidelberg College – Trustee 1913-1936
- People's Hospital – Founding Member 1914, Director Board of Directors 1914–1937, Honorary Board Member 1937-1955
- U.S. Chamber of Commerce – Director Wisconsin, Illinois & Ohio Region 1915–1918, Chairman of the Highways Committee 1921
- Lincoln Memorial University – Trustee 1915-1935
- American Red Cross – Vice-Chairman 1916
- Western Reserve Academy – Trustee 1916-1936
- Fairlawn Heights – Developer 1917
- Fairlawn Country Club – Founding Member 1917
- Red Cross, Akron Chapter – Vice President 1917
- City of Akron Americanization Committee – Chairman, 1918
- Akron War Chest Drive (Community Fund) – Campaign Manager 1918
- Metropolitan Park Board – Founding Member 1921, Trustee 1921-1935
- Rubber Manufacturers Association – President 1929

Seiberling's private home Stan Hywet Hall and Gardens, a Tudor Revival home built in 1915, remains in Akron and is now a National Historic landmark and historic house museum open to the public. Originally the site encompassed approximately 3,000 acres of land. Portions of the property were broken off during Seiberling's lifetime to create the Fairlawn Heights neighborhood and Sand Run Metro Park. Today the 501(c)3 museum maintains 70 acres including the 64,500 square foot historic manor home, five service buildings and thirty acres of historic gardens designed by Warren Manning.

== Personal life ==
In 1887, he married Gertrude Ferguson Penfield, who was later to serve (1919–1921) as president of the National Federation of Music Clubs. The couple had seven children, three girls (Irene, Virginia, Grace Wenonah) and four boys (Fredrick, Willard, Penfield, and Franklin)--their youngest daughter Grace Wenonah did not live to adulthood; she died of bronchial pneumonia at 18 months old. Their son Frederick married Henrietta McBrayer Buckler. They were the parents of U.S. congressman from Ohio John F. Seiberling, Jr., and Henrietta connected the founders of Alcoholics Anonymous.

Seiberling died in Akron on August 11, 1955, of pneumonia, and is buried in Glendale Cemetery.
