= Wadsworth Township, Medina County, Ohio =

Township in Ohio, US

- Township
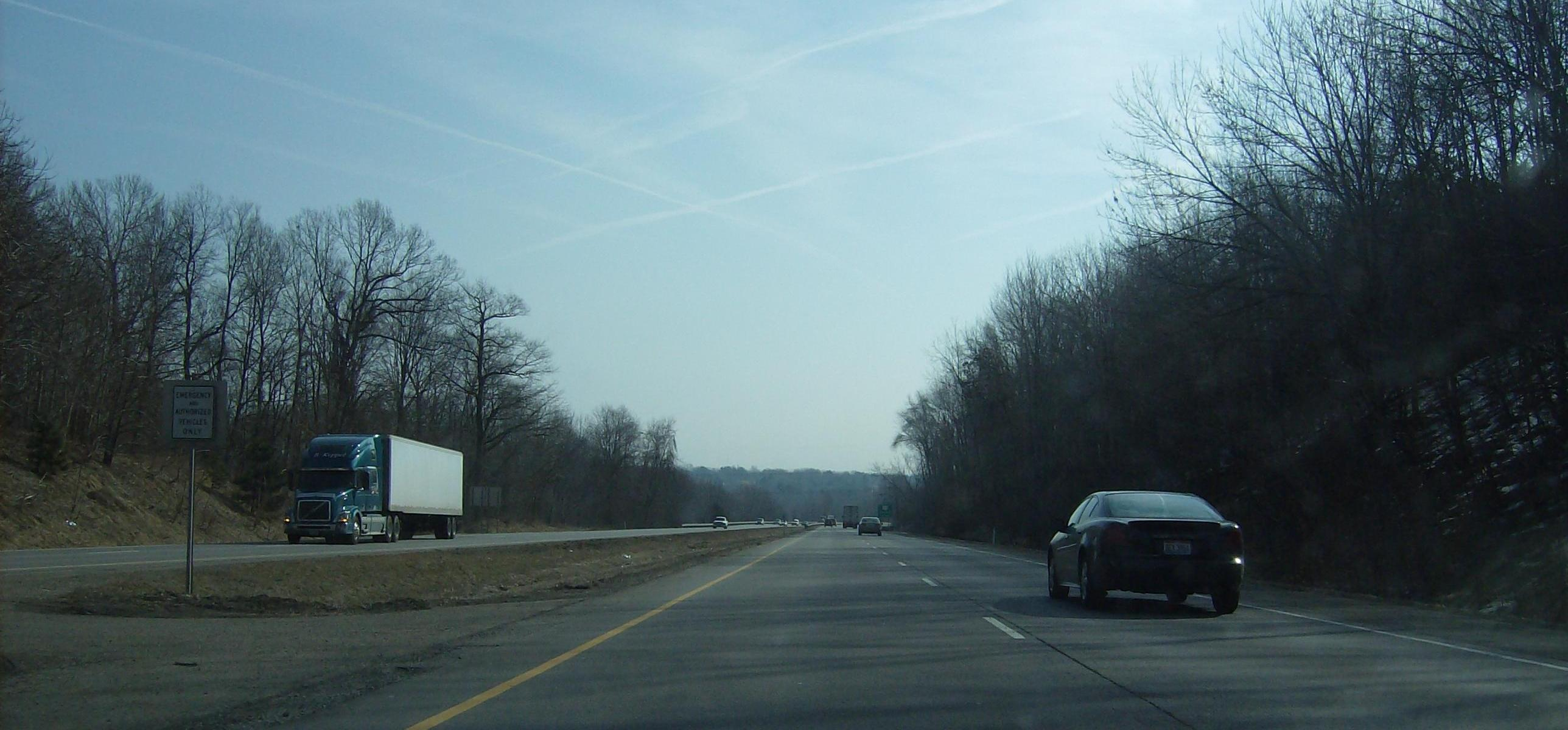
- Interstate 76 passes through wooded areas of Wadsworth Township

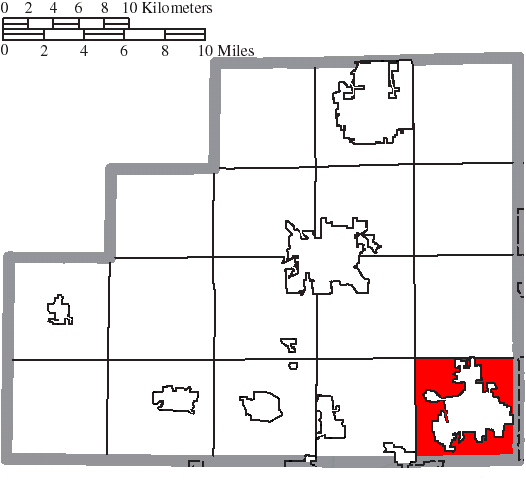
- Location of Wadsworth Township in Medina County
- Coordinates: 41°2′11″N 81°44′36″W
- Country: United States
- State: Ohio
- County: Medina

Area
  - Total: 16.5 sq mi (42.7 km^{2})
  - Land: 16.5 sq mi (42.7 km^{2})
  - Water: 0 sq mi (0.0 km^{2})
- Elevation: 1,194 ft (364 m)

Population (2020)
  - Total: 4,384
  - Density: 266/sq mi (103/km^{2})
- Time zone: UTC-5 (Eastern (EST))
  - Summer (DST): UTC-4 (EDT)
- ZIP codes: 44281-44282
- Area code: 330
- FIPS code: 39-80318
- GNIS feature ID: 1086605
- Website: https://www.wadsworthtownship.org/

Wadsworth Township is one of the seventeen townships of Medina County, Ohio, United States. The 2020 census found 4,384 people in the township.

== Geography ==
Located in the southeast corner of the county, it borders the following townships and city:

- Sharon Township - north
- Copley Township, Summit County - northeast corner
- Norton - east
- Chippewa Township, Wayne County - south
- Milton Township, Wayne County - southwest
- Guilford Township - west
- Montville Township - northwest corner

The western side of the unincorporated community of Western Star is located along the east-central border of the township. (The eastern side of Western Star is within the corporate limits of Norton in Summit County.)

The city of Wadsworth occupies central Wadsworth Township.

== Name and history ==
It is the only Wadsworth Township statewide.

== Government ==
The township is governed by a three-member board of trustees, who are elected in November of odd-numbered years to a four-year term beginning on the following January 1. Two are elected in the year after the presidential election and one is elected in the year before it. There is also an elected township fiscal officer, who serves a four-year term beginning on April 1 of the year after the election, which is held in November of the year before the presidential election. Vacancies in the fiscal officership or on the board of trustees are filled by the remaining trustees.

Public safety in Wadsworth Township is the responsibility of the Wadsworth Fire Department and the Medina County Sheriff's Office.
