= Western Star, Ohio =

Unincorporated community in Ohio, U.S.

Coordinates: 41°01′32″N 81°41′16″W

Western Star is an unincorporated community and neighborhood located at the intersection of Greenwich Road and South Medina Line Road in the U.S. state of Ohio. The eastern side of the community is within the corporate limits of Norton in Summit County, while the western side of the community is in an unincorporated region of Wadsworth Township in Medina County.

Because the community is neither incorporated nor classified as a census-designated place, official population figures are not available.

== History ==
Western Star was named for Nathan Starr, who donated land for a school in exchange for the naming rights. A post office called Western Star was established in 1843, and remained in operation until 1910.
