= Stan Hywet Hall and Gardens =

Historic house museum and gardens in Akron, Ohio, United States

- Stan Hywet Hall-Frank A. Seiberling House
- U.S. National Register of Historic Places
- U.S. National Historic Landmark
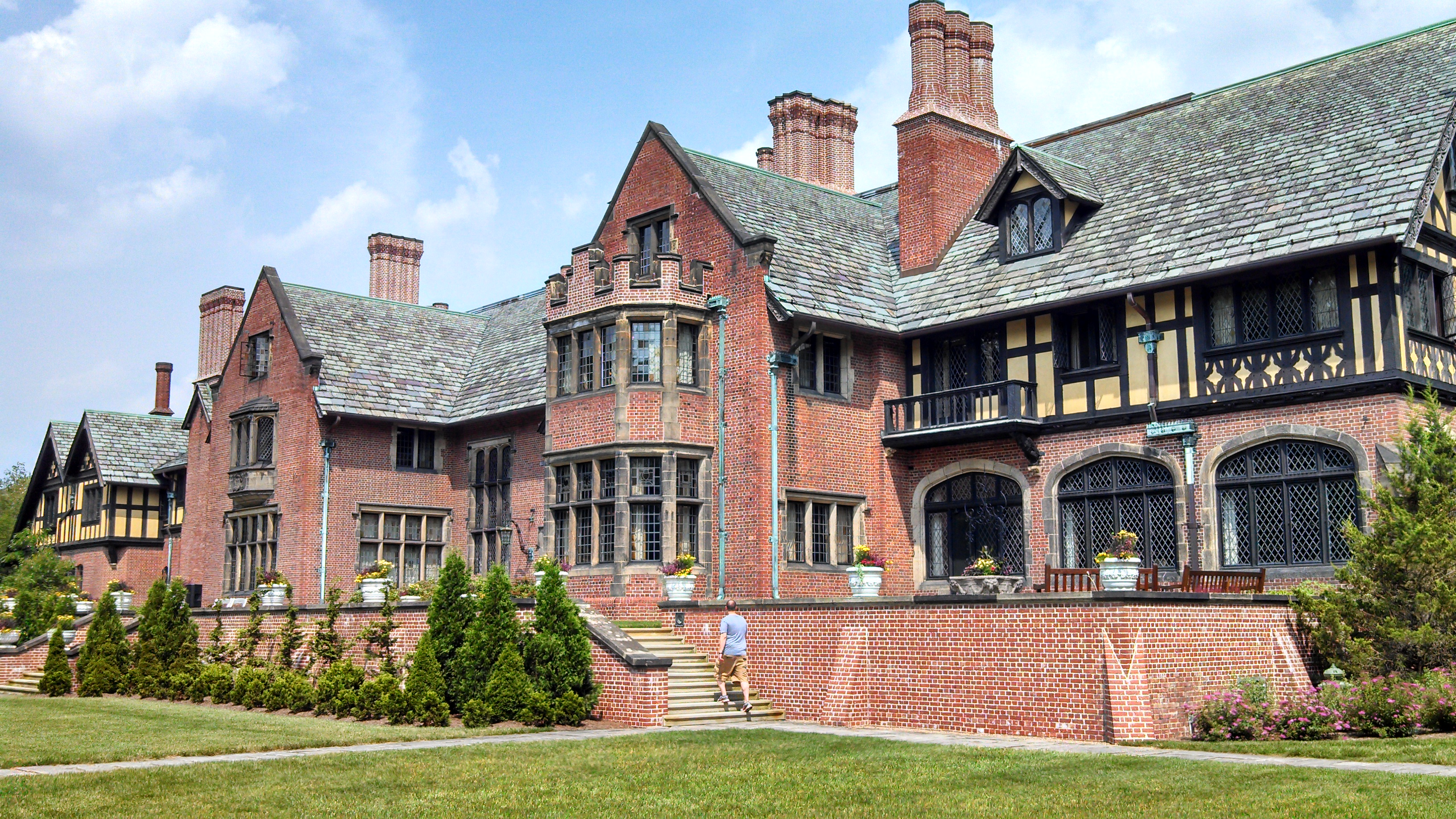

- Location within Ohio Location within the United States
- Interactive map showing the location of Stan Hywet Hall-Frank A. Seiberling House
- Location: 714 N. Portage Path, Akron, Ohio
- Coordinates: 41°7′7″N 81°33′5″W
- Area: 70 acres (28 ha)
- Built: 1911
- Architects: Charles S. Schneider, Warren H. Manning
- Architectural style: Tudor Revival
- Website: Official website
- NRHP reference No.: 75002058

Significant dates
- Added to NRHP: January 17, 1975
- Designated NHL: December 21, 1981

Stan Hywet Hall & Gardens (70 acres) is a historic house museum in Akron, Ohio. The estate includes gardens, a greenhouse, carriage house, and the main mansion, one of the largest houses in the United States. A National Historic Landmark, it is nationally significant as the home of F. A. Seiberling, co-founder of the Goodyear Tire and Rubber Company.

== History ==
=== Conception and creation ===
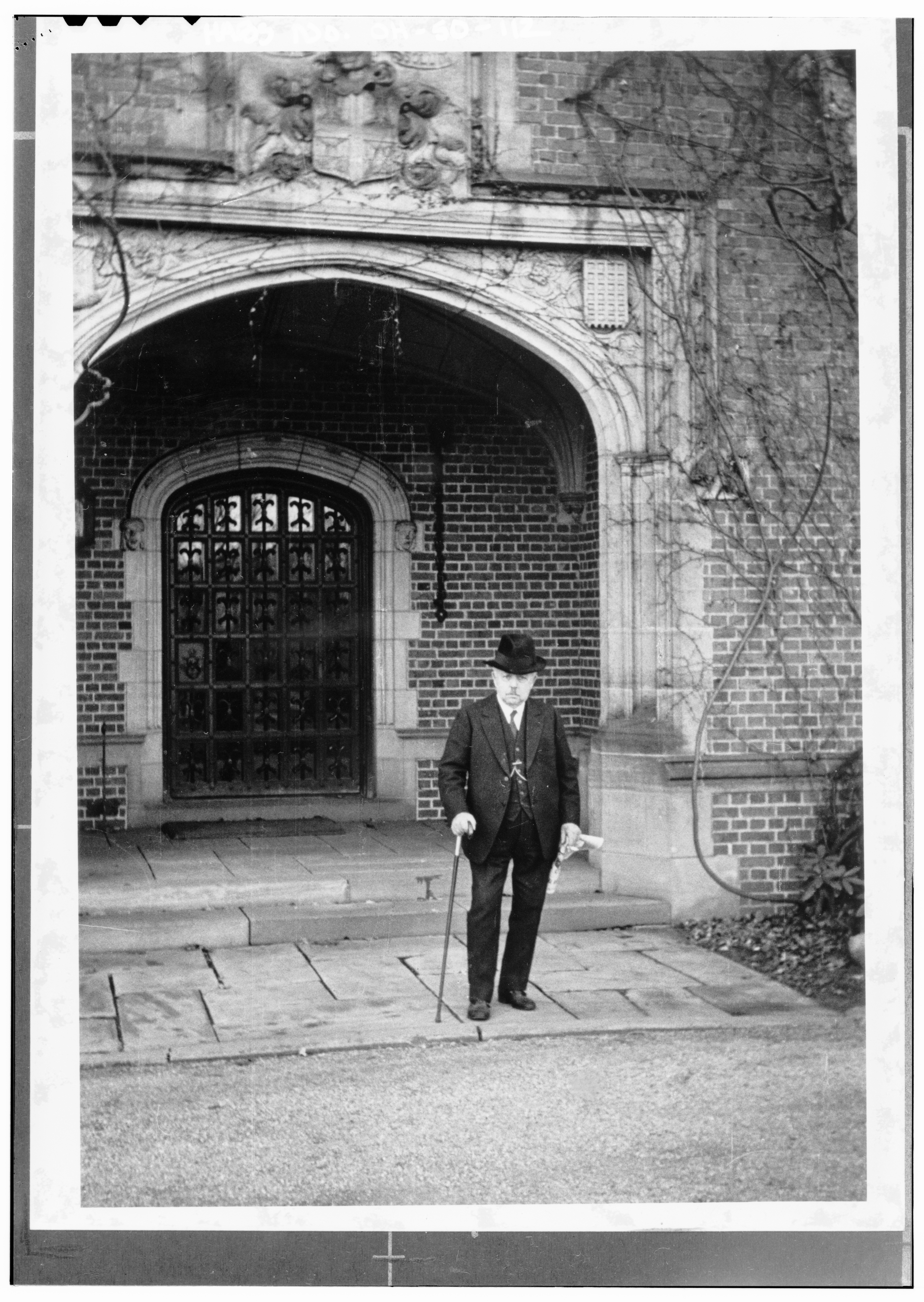
F. A. Seiberling in front of the house, 1942

The estate was built between 1912 and 1915 for F. A. Seiberling, co-founder of the Goodyear Tire and Rubber Company, and his wife, Gertrude Ferguson Penfield Seiberling. They named their "American Country Estate" Stan Hywet, loosely translated from Old English meaning "stone quarry" or "stone hewn", to reflect the site's earlier use and the abandoned stone quarries located on the grounds of the Averill Dairy estate.

Frank and Gertrude Seiberling hired three professionals to shape the outcome of their home building project: Boston landscape architect Warren Manning, New York City interior designer Hugo Huber and Cleveland architect Charles Sumner Schneider. Schneider originally pitched his design as an employee of George Post & Sons, a New York City architectural firm. Schneider left the company in 1913, but retained creative control and oversight of the building project.

In April 1912, the Seiberlings, with oldest daughter Irene and architect Schneider, traveled to England to tour approximately 20 manor homes to gather inspiration for the home's design. Three English country homes served as the inspiration for Stan Hywet: Compton Wynyates, Ockwells Manor, and Haddon Hall.

The long, sprawling Manor House encompasses 64,500 square feet (5,990 m^{2}) and includes four floors and a lower level (basement). In conceiving their dream home, the Seiberlings asked each family member what he or she desired. Gertrude requested a large music room, the boys requested an indoor swimming pool, and a private office for F.A. The house included a formal dining room that would seat up to 40 people, five guest bedrooms with adjoining full bathrooms and walk-in closets, and eight live-in servants' bedrooms.

=== Interior design ===
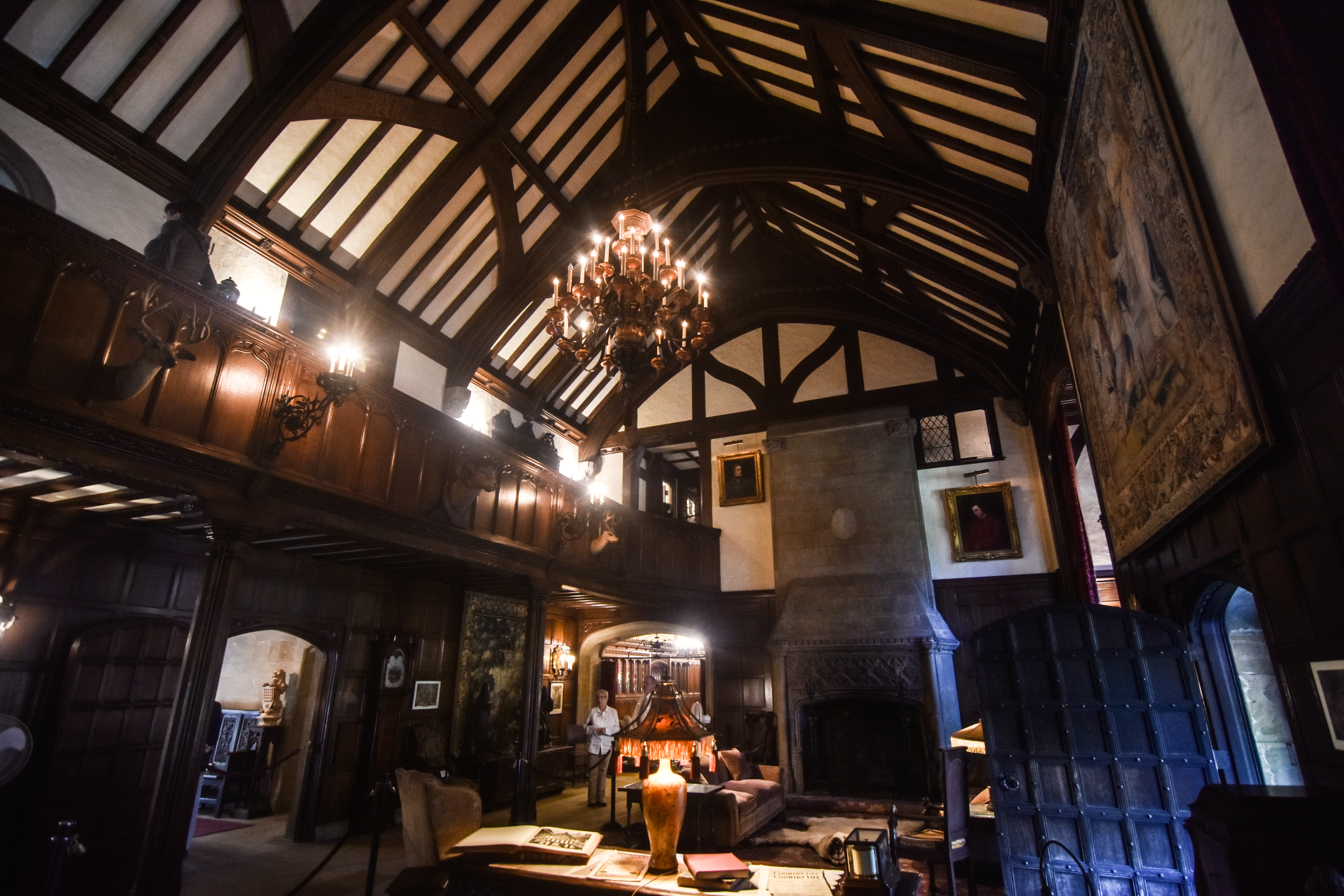
The great hall

Interior designer Hugo Huber worked with Gertrude Seiberling to furnish the home's interior. The pair made frequent shopping trips to New York City and Huber traveled with F.A. and Gertrude to England in January 1915 to look at antique pieces for the home.

Gertrude initially wanted to furnish the entire home in period appropriate Tudor antiques but F.A. argued that the large family would need comfortable furnishings. Huber compromised by integrating a selection of Tudor antiques with contemporary 1915 furnishings that were made to look antique and fit the overall décor of the home.

=== Landscape design ===
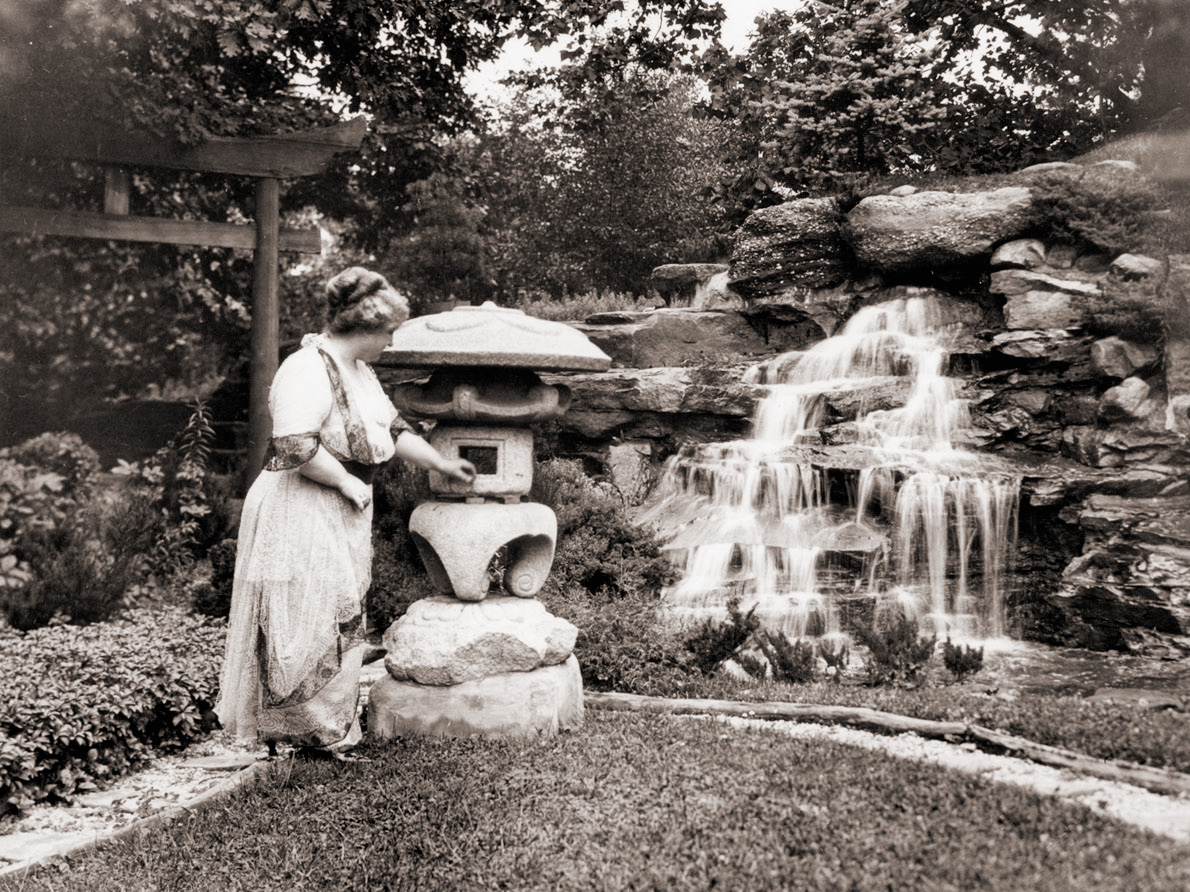
Gertrude Seiberling in the Japanese Garden at Stan Hywet, c. 1920

The estate grounds, originally about 1,500 acres (610 ha)[5] in extent, were designed between 1911 and 1915 by Boston landscape architect Warren H. Manning. Manning sited the house at the edge of the quarry wall, overlooking the Cuyahoga Valley and rolling hills in the distance.

Around the home, he created a series of vistas which related the home to the environment around it, intertwining the two in a unified design. The entrance to the property (through an existing apple orchard), and the two allées on the north and south sides of the house, provide examples of vistas created by Manning using arranged plant materials. Along the back of the house, Manning manipulated existing forest plantings, and removed growth to create outlooks over miles of undisturbed countryside to capture the endless expanse of the Seiberlings' property.

Around the house, Manning designed a sequence of contrasting garden spaces which situated formal garden rooms – such as the English Garden, Breakfast Room Garden, Perennial Garden, Japanese Garden and West Terrace – within the existing natural landscape. Manning used a technique of plant massing where he used predominately native plant materials, grouping deciduous trees with small ornamental trees and swaths of perennial plantings, to carve vistas and gardens giving definition and movement to his design. The garden spaces were tailored to the needs of the Seiberling family and envisioned as outdoor rooms for the family to use for relaxation and entertaining.

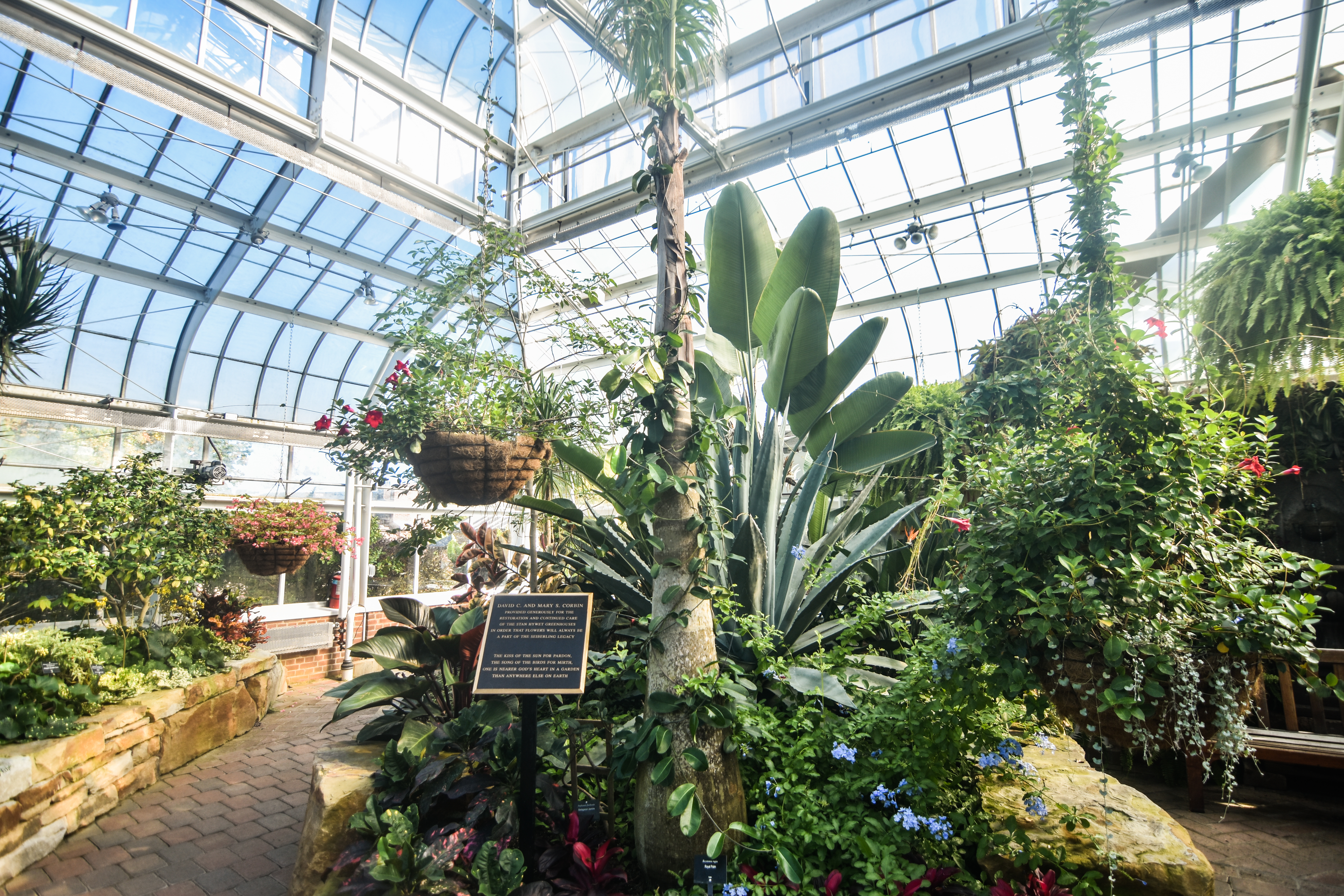
In addition to the many outdoor gardens, there is also a conservatory and greenhouses on the estate.

The Japanese Garden was built in 1916 by Chicago Japanese landscape artist T.R. Otsuka to the overall layout designed by Manning. The English garden was redesigned in 1929 by landscape architect Ellen Biddle Shipman. The landscape has undergone two significant restorations: the first in 1984, when a master plan was created to return the property to Warren Manning's original landscape plan, and the second between 2000 and 2010, to rebuild all of the gardens and landscaping around the Manor House. All historic gardens have been restored; the final garden space to be restored was the Lagoon area, a series of 5 manmade ponds, which was restored in 2020.

The estate also includes a conservatory and greenhouses constructed by King Construction Company of North Tonawanda, New York, and specified the construction of a rectangular Palm House with a 24 foot wide greenhouse on the back with a wing on each side, for a cost of $18,330. The greenhouse space behind the Palm House was initially divided into a "general plant house", an "orchid house" and a "vegetable house". The original 1915 building was damaged in a wind storm in 1947. In 2005, Stan Hywet Hall & Gardens constructed a new conservatory and greenhouses based on the original historic designs.

=== Recreational spaces ===
The estate grounds also included many recreation areas for the Seiberlings and their guests: two tennis courts (one for servants), a roque court, horse trails, a four-hole golf course, lagoons for swimming and boating, an indoor swimming pool and a gymnasium.

=== Preservation ===
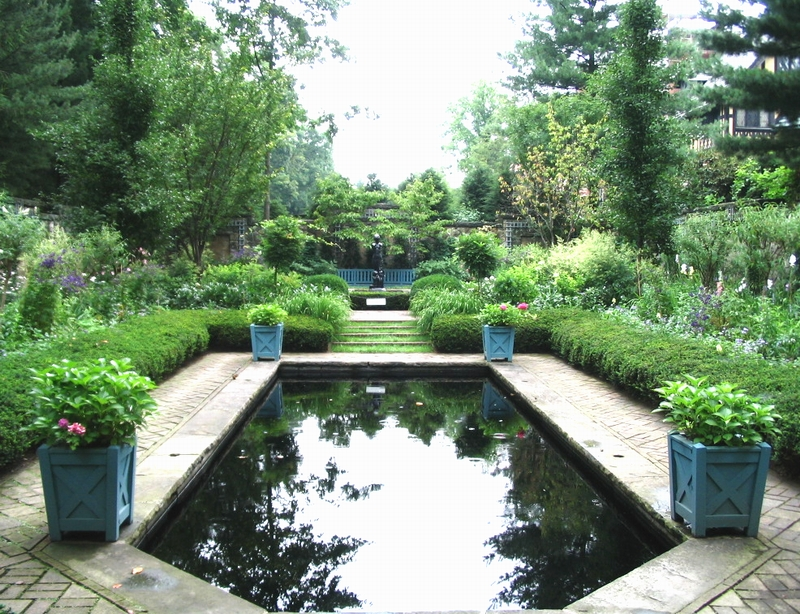
The English Garden was originally designed by Warren H. Manning and later redesigned by Ellen Biddle Shipman in the late 1920s, which was then restored in the early 1990s. This is one of the few restored Shipman gardens open to the public.

In 1957, the six surviving adult Seiberling children donated Stan Hywet to the newly formed Stan Hywet Hall Foundation, a non-profit organization formed for the preservation of the estate. It is now a historic house museum and country estate, open seasonally to the public, in keeping with the stone inscription above the Manor House front door, "Non nobis solum", meaning "Not for us alone".

From 2015 to 2021, the Manor House underwent an extensive room-by-room restoration, funded by the successful "2nd Century Campaign".

Stan Hywet Hall & Gardens is open Tuesday through Sunday, from April 1 through December 30. It is closed to the public on Mondays. An admission fee is charged, and various tours are available.

== Gallery ==
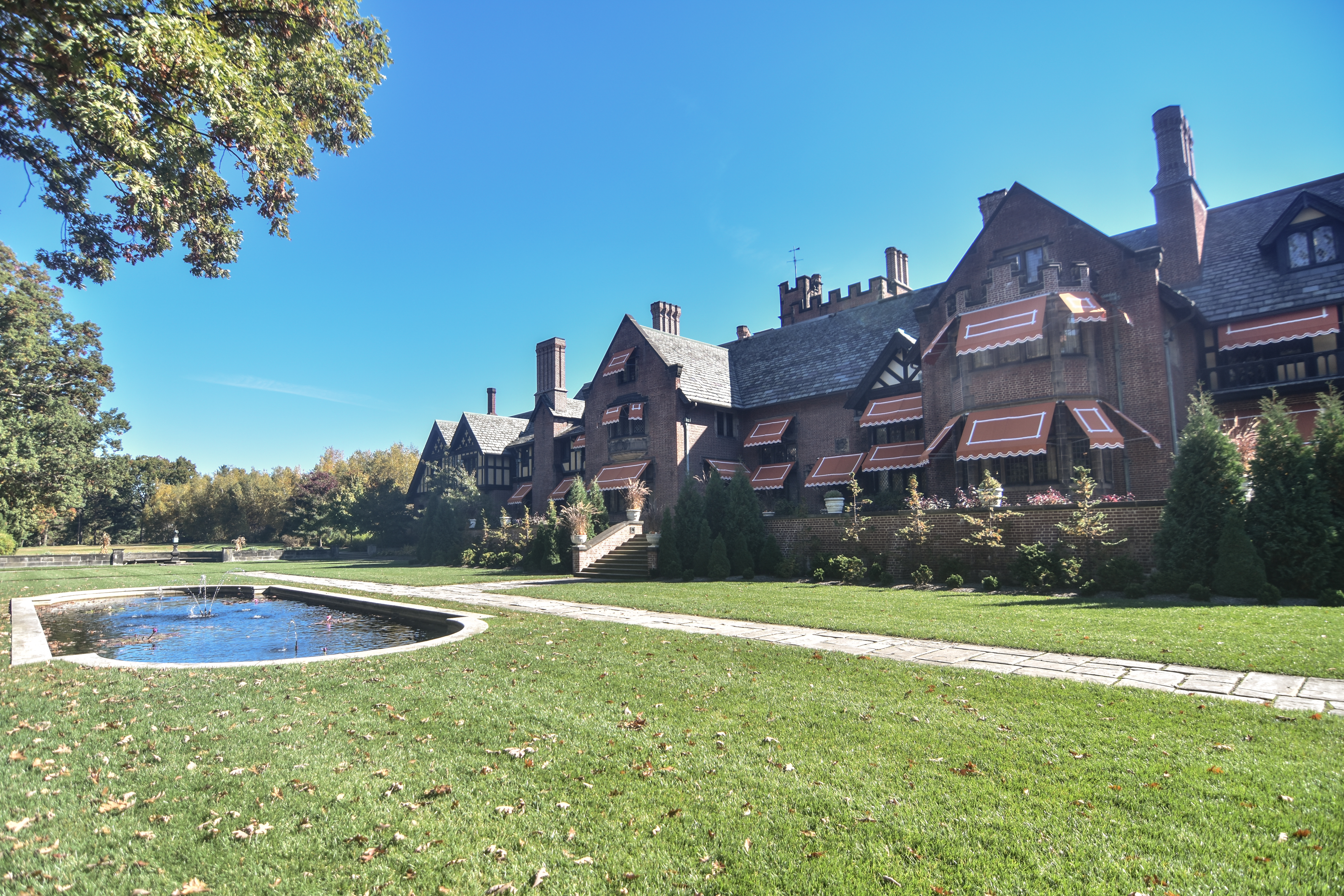
Small pond near the mansion

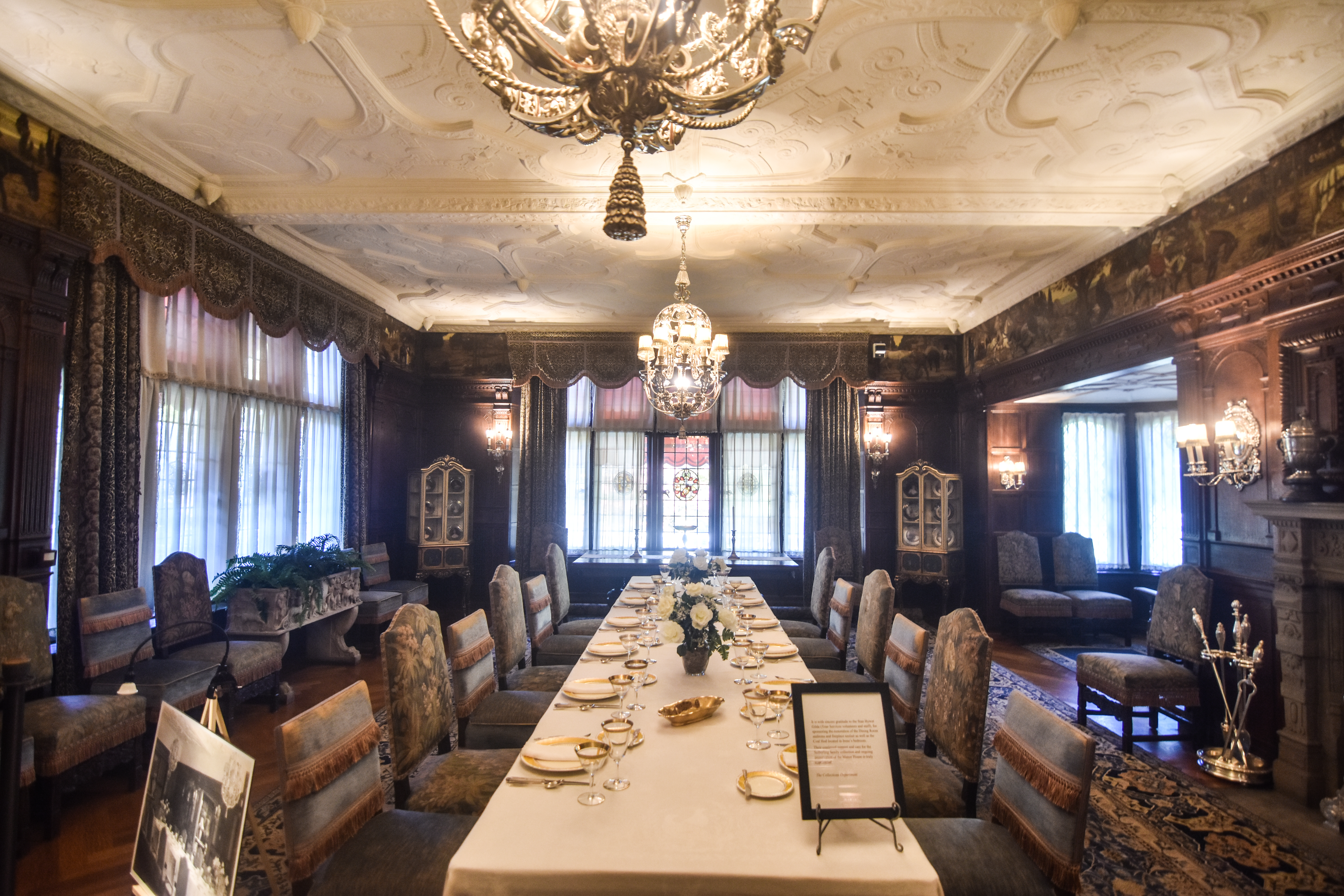
Dining area

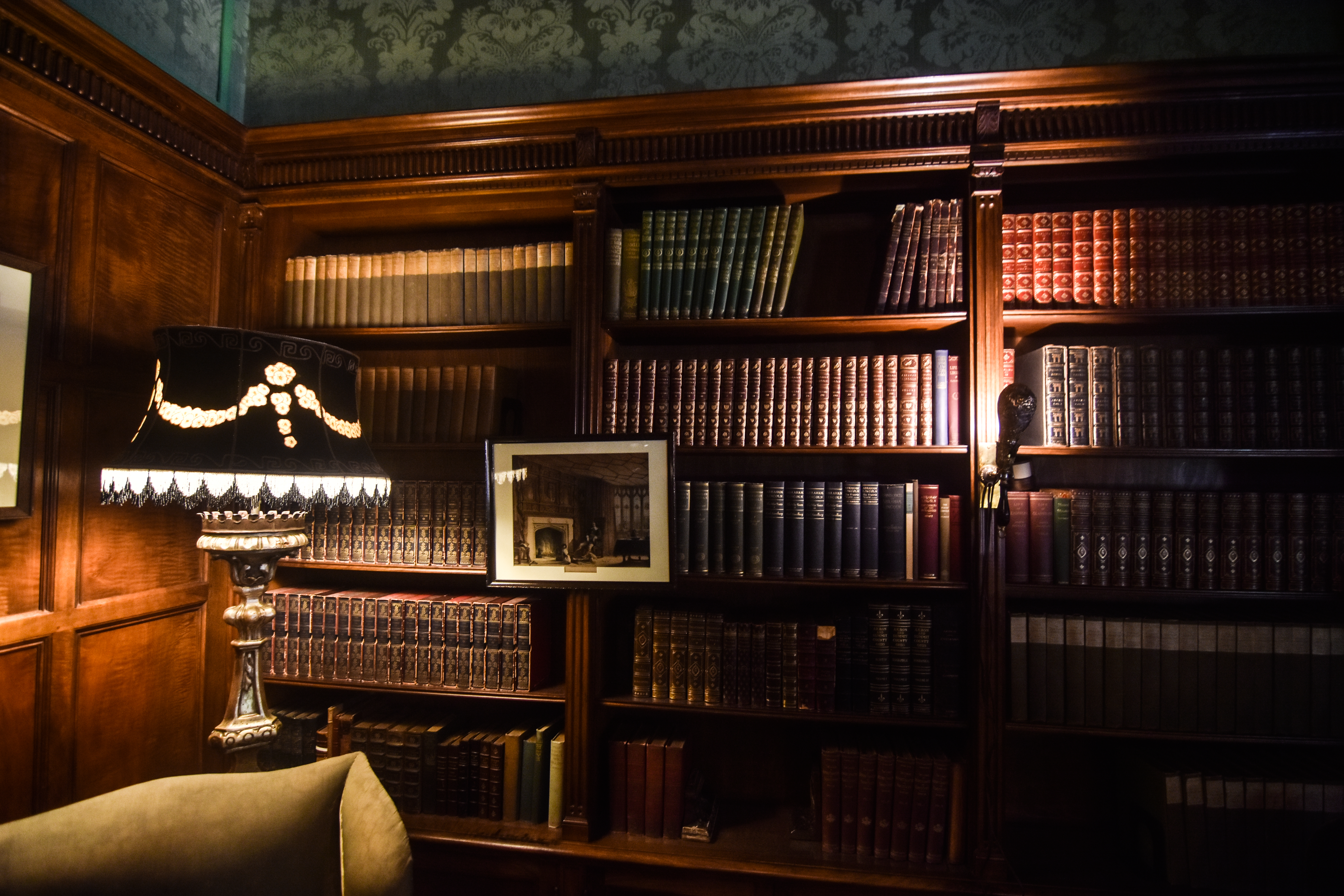
Library

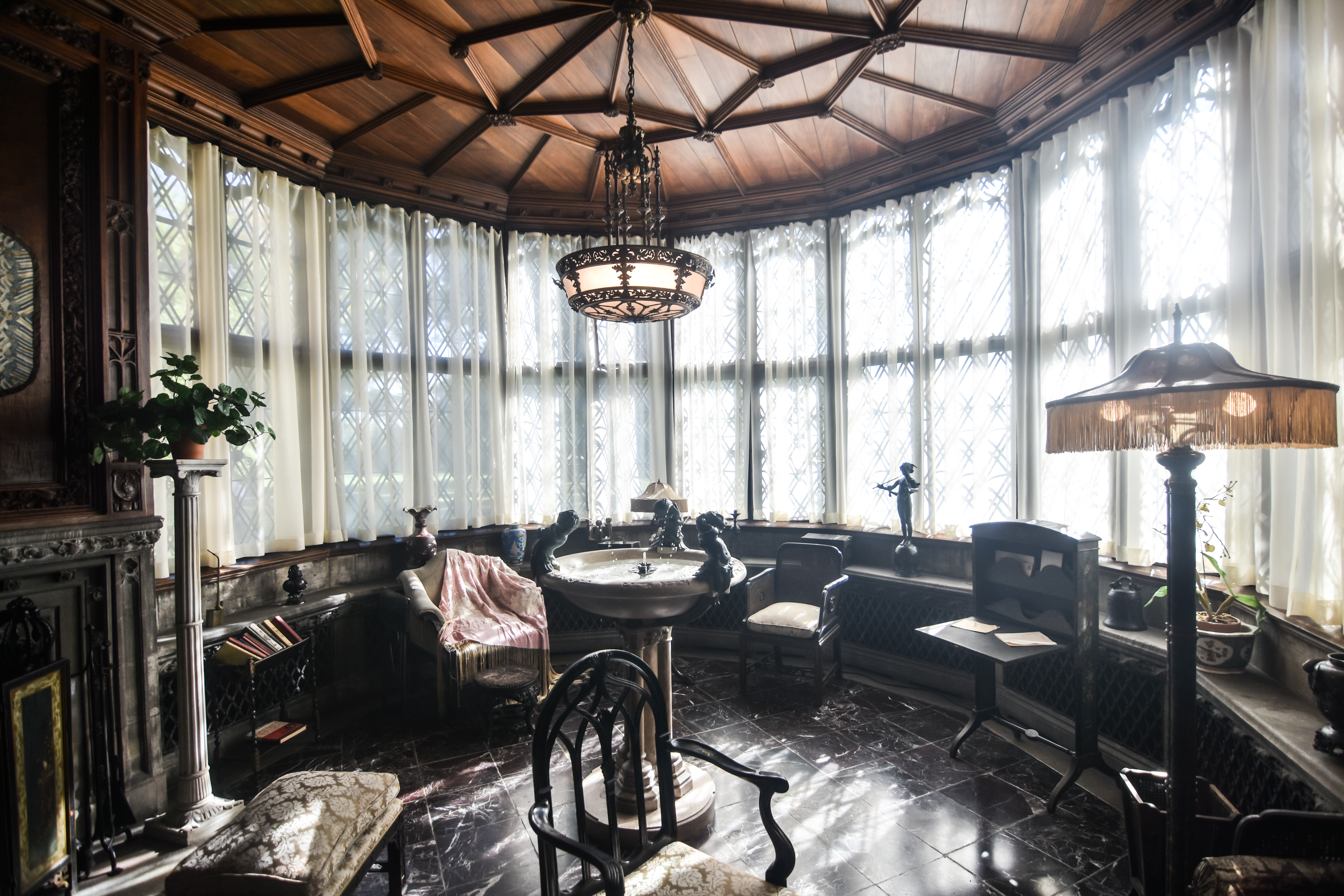
Solarium

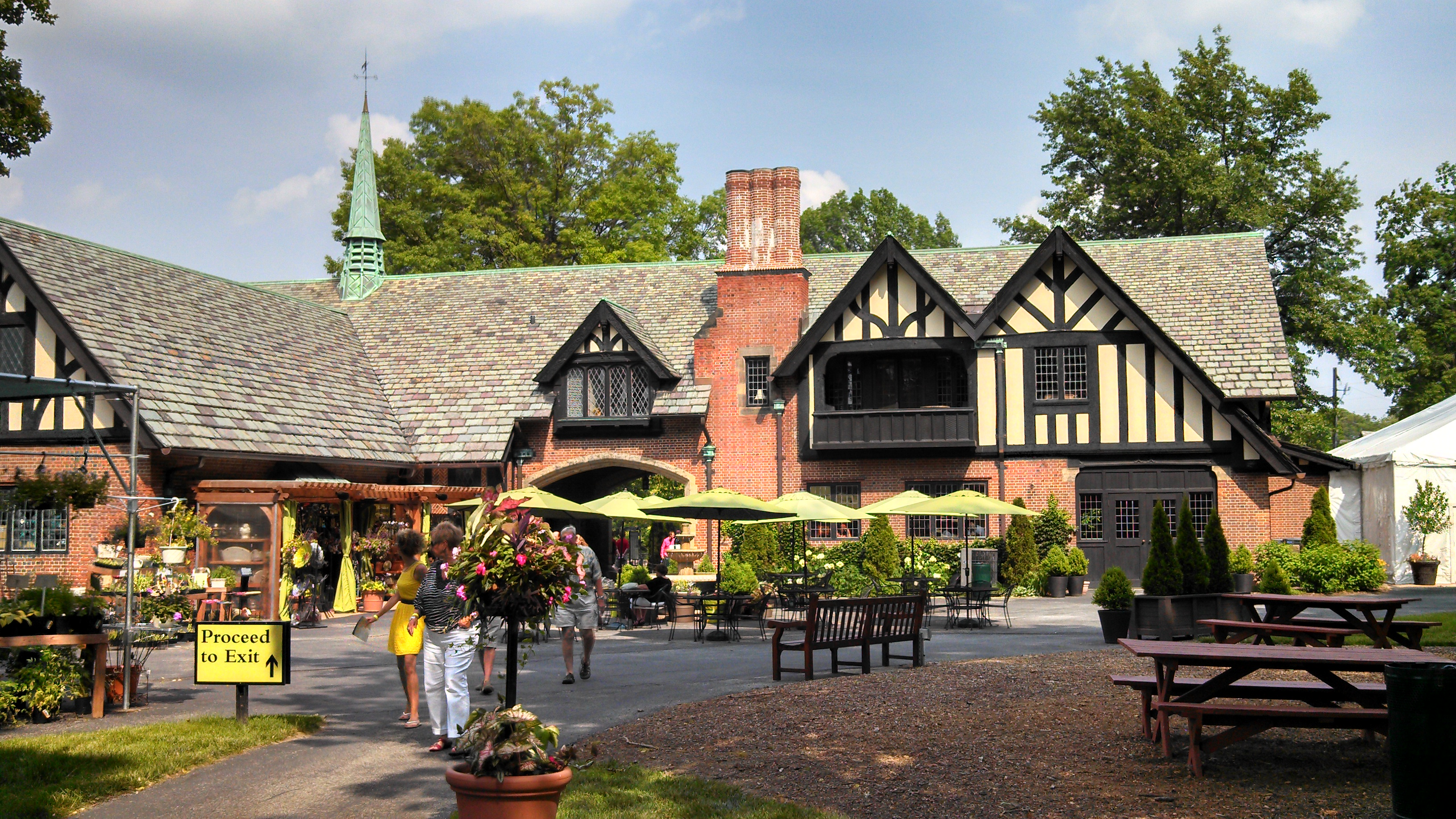
Visitor's Center

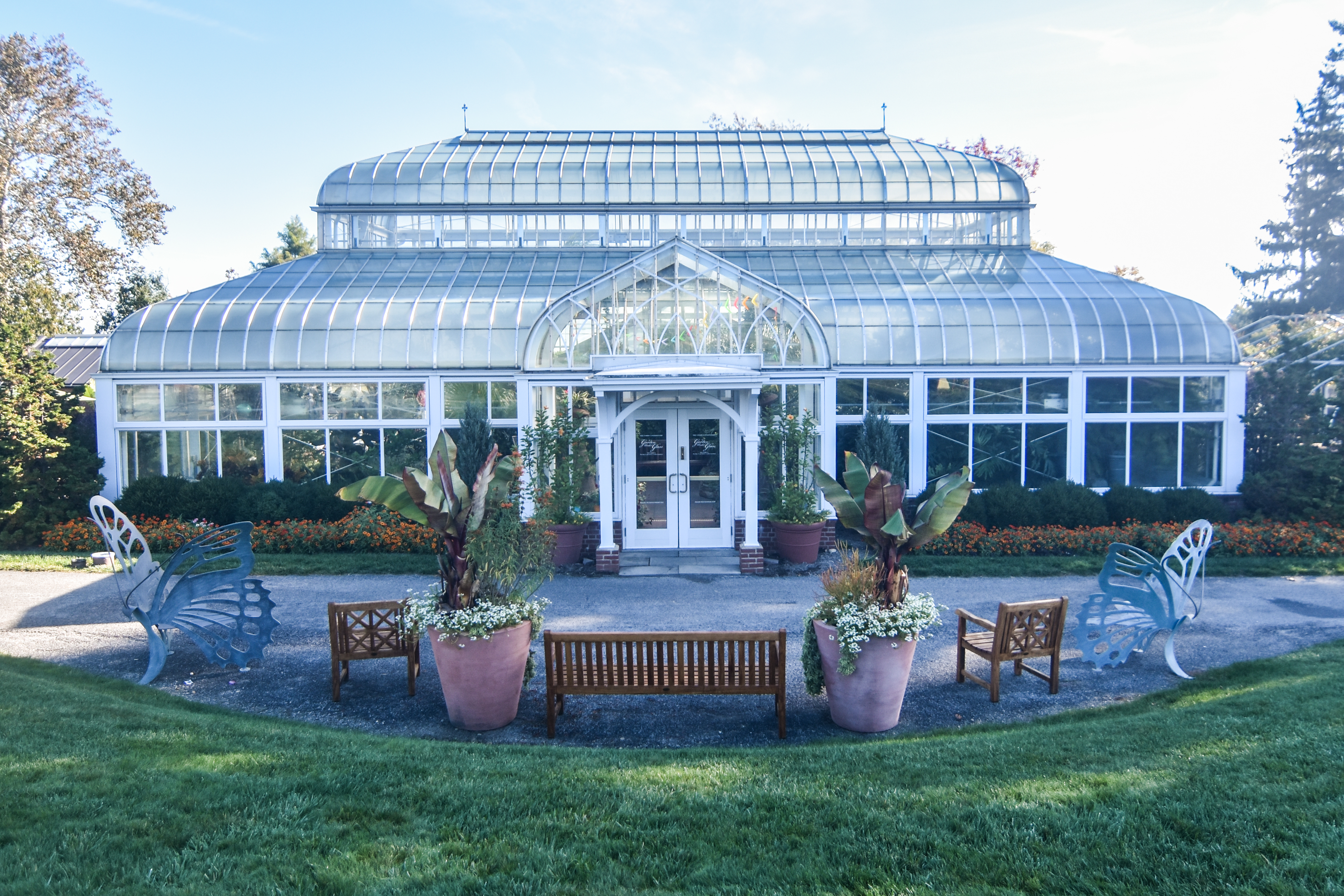
Artwork outside of the conservatory

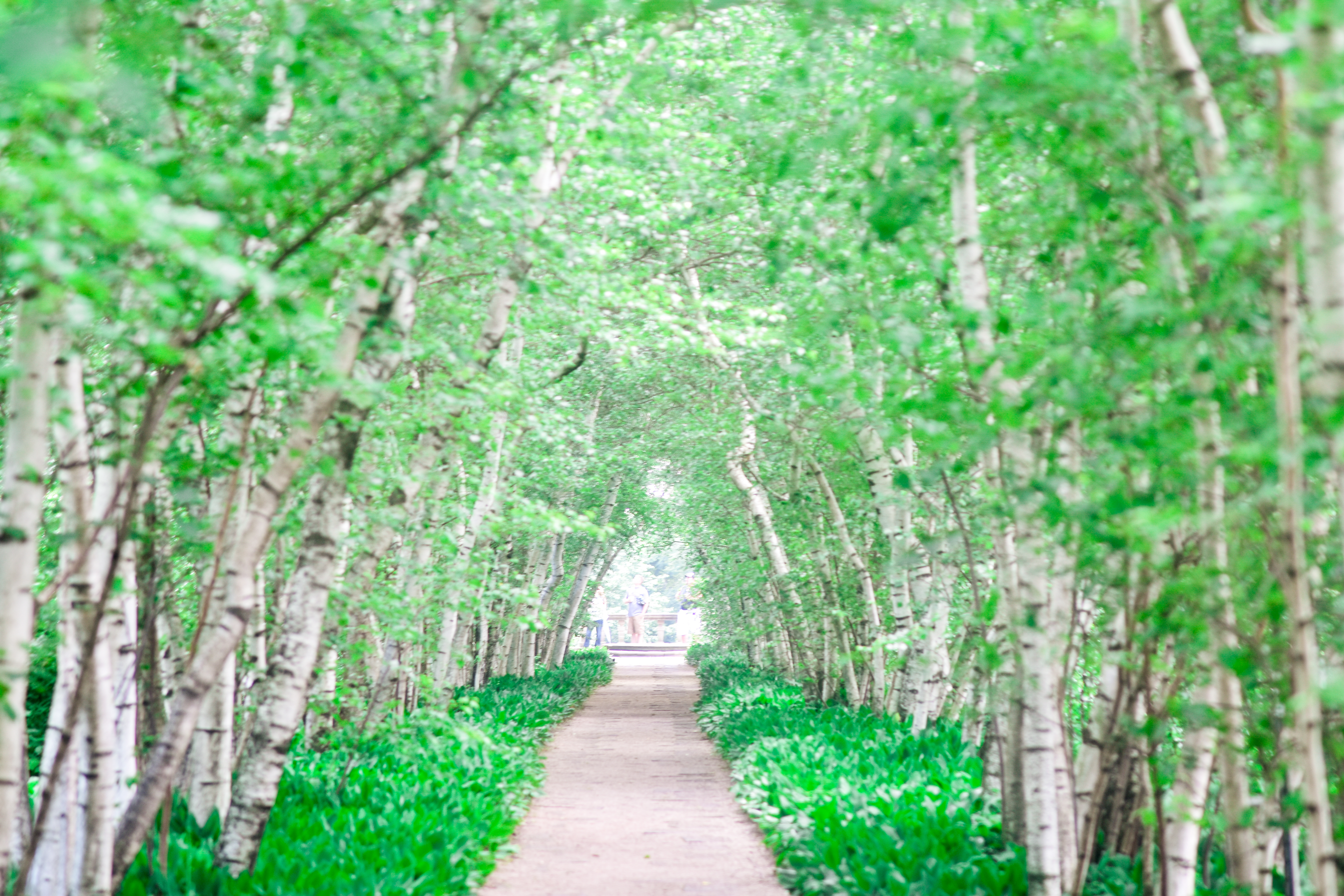
Tree lined path between areas of the gardens

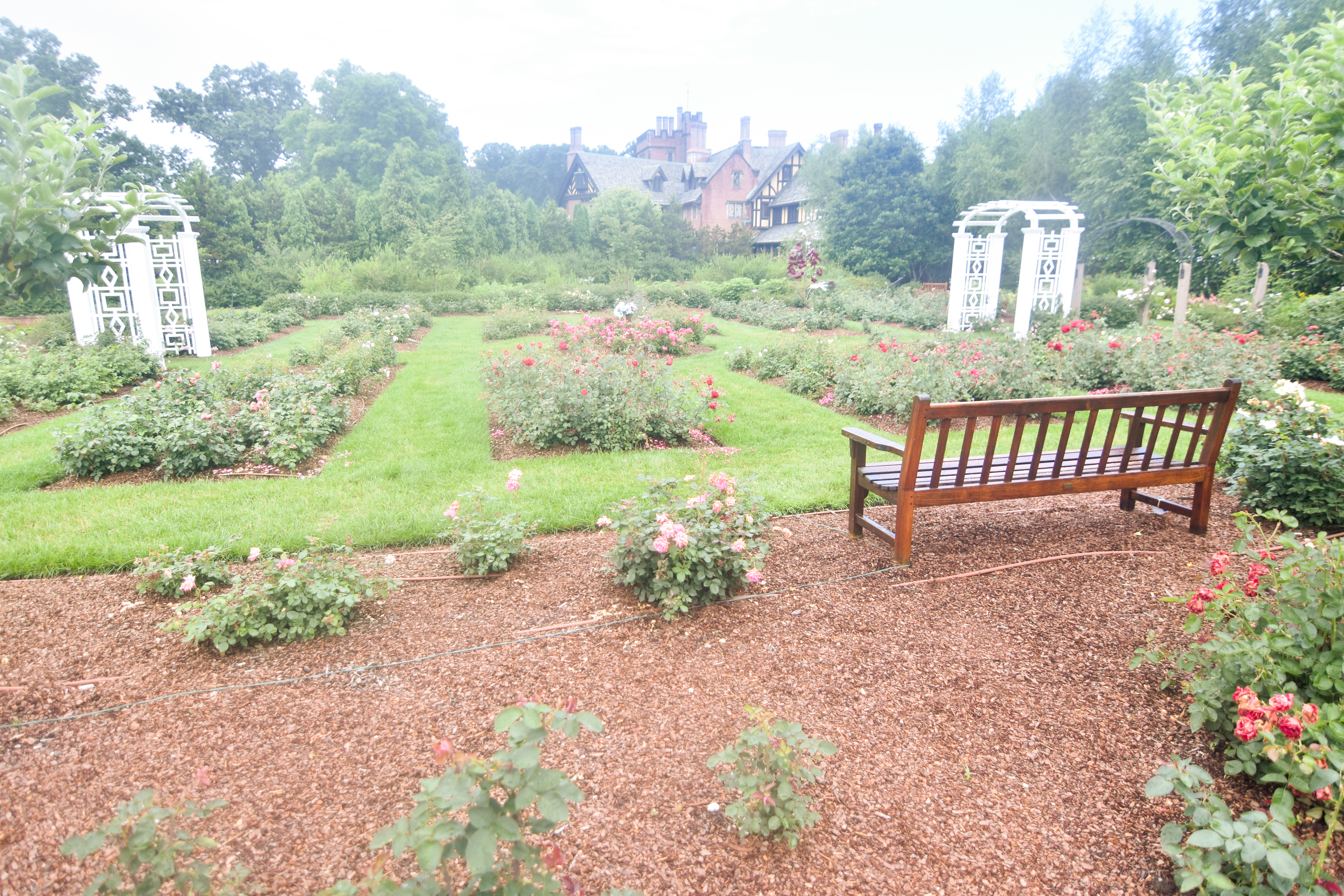
A view of one of the garden areas

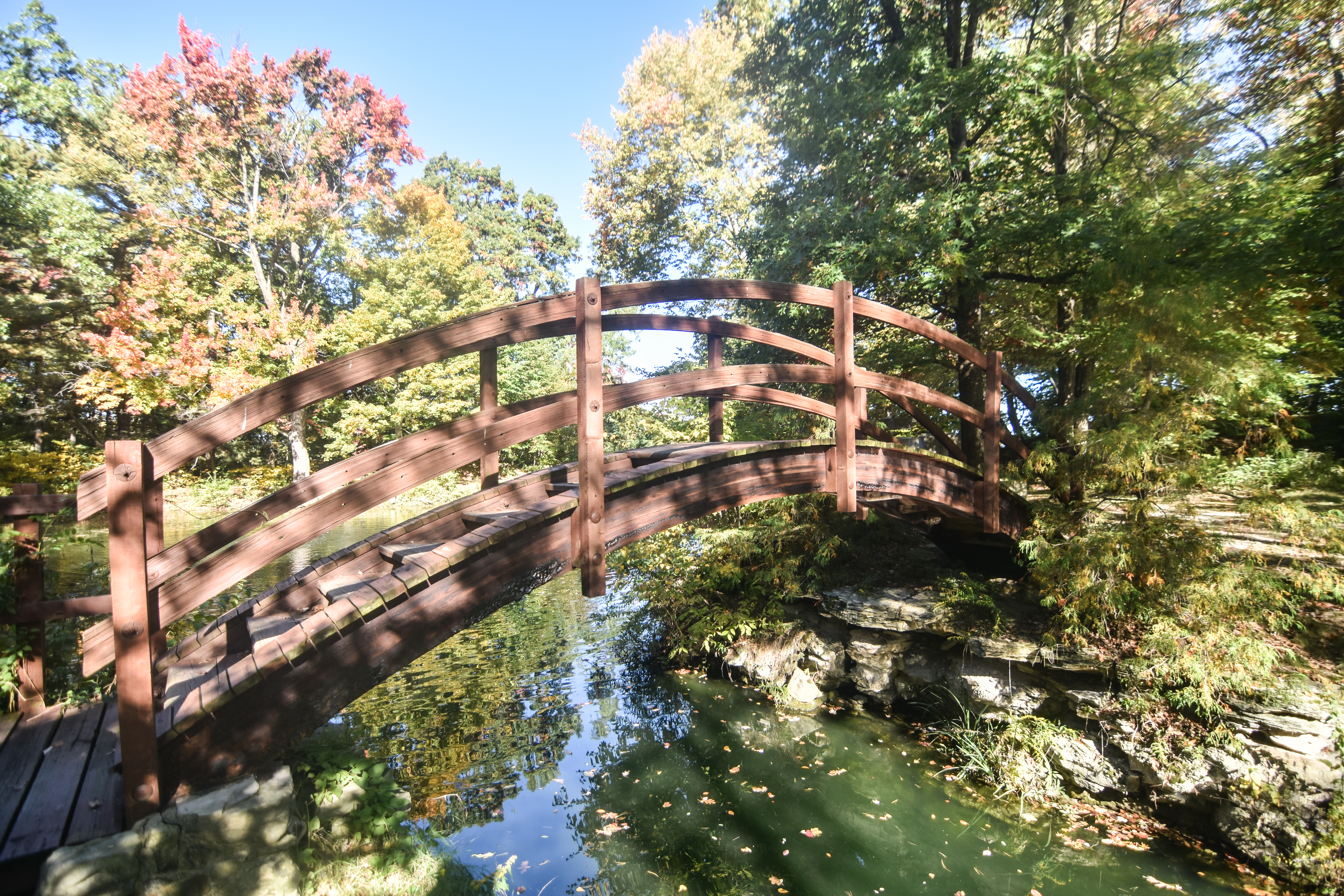
Bridge over a pond

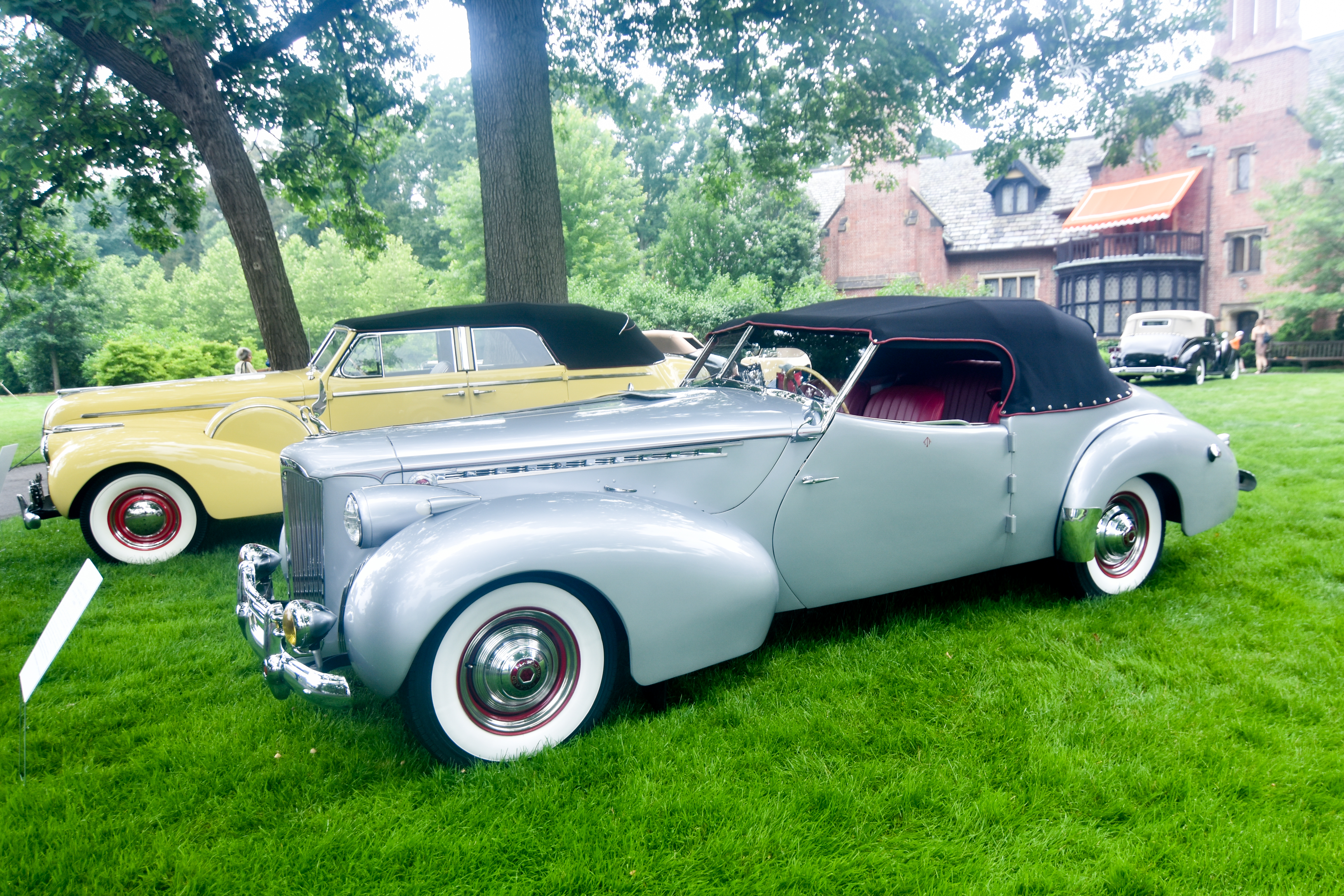
Classic car shows have been held at the estate.

== See also ==
- List of largest houses in the United States
- List of botanical gardens in the United States
- List of National Historic Landmarks in Ohio
