= STS-130 =

2010 American crewed spaceflight to the ISS

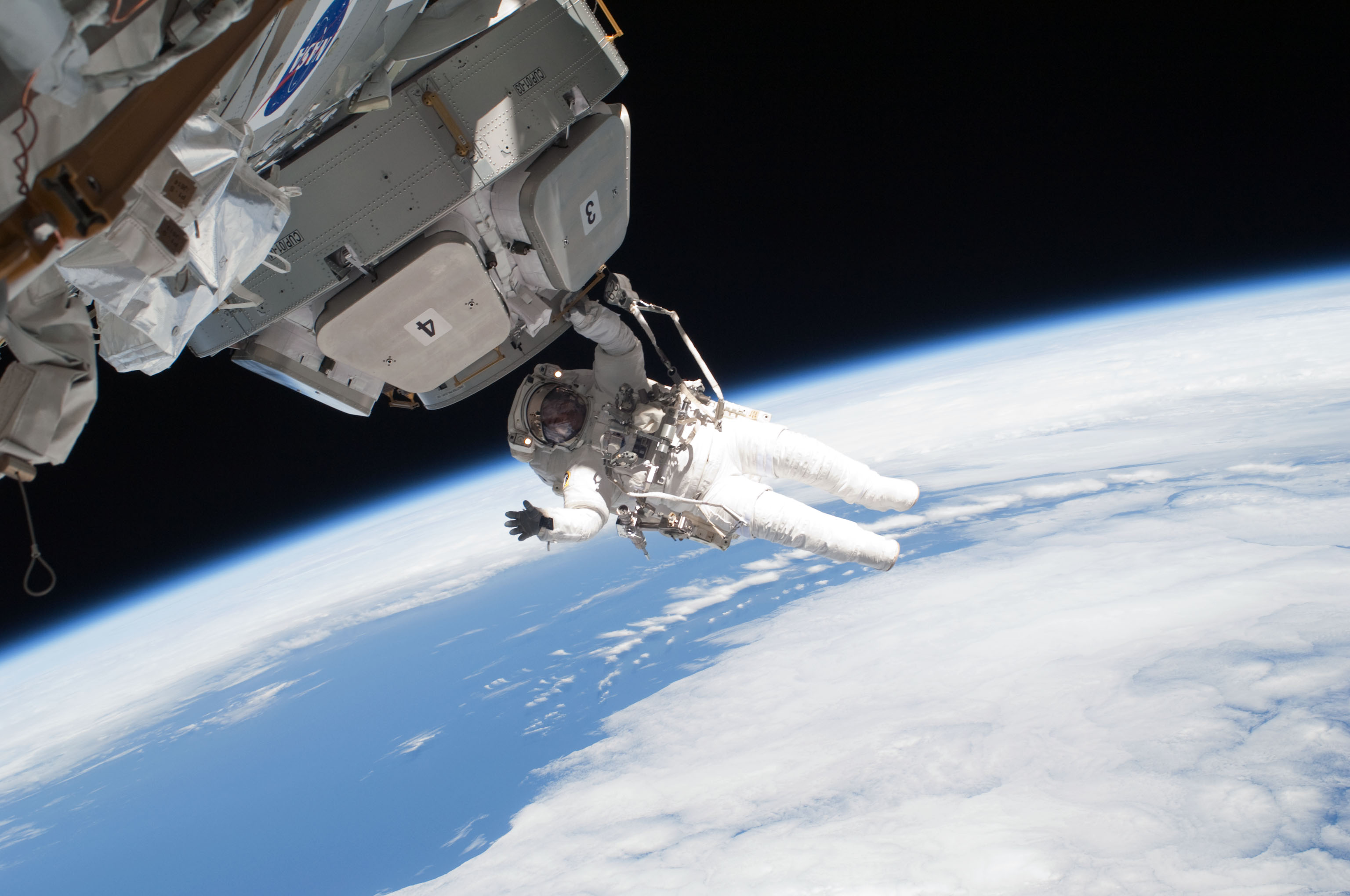
- Patrick during EVA 3, preparing the Cupola for operational use following its installation on the ISS
- Names: Space Transportation System-130
- Mission type: ISS assembly
- Operator: NASA
- COSPAR ID: 2010-004A
- SATCAT no.: 36394
- Mission duration: 13 days, 18 hours, 6 minutes, 22 seconds
- Distance travelled: 9,250,000 kilometres (5,750,000 mi)
- Orbits completed: 217

Spacecraft properties
- Spacecraft: Space Shuttle Endeavour
- Launch mass: 121,320 kilograms (267,470 lb)
- Landing mass: 91,033 kilograms (200,694 lb)
- Payload mass: 19,000 kilograms (42,000 lb)

Crew
- Crew size: 6
- Members: George D. Zamka; Terry W. Virts Jr.; Kathryn P. Hire; Stephen Robinson; Nicholas Patrick; Robert L. Behnken

Start of mission
- Launch date: February 8, 2010, 09:14:08 UTC 4:14:08 am EDT
- Launch site: Kennedy, LC-39A

End of mission
- Landing date: February 22, 2010, 03:22:10 UTC 10:22:10 pm EDT
- Landing site: Kennedy, SLF Runway 15

Orbital parameters
- Reference system: Geocentric
- Regime: Low Earth
- Perigee altitude: 341 kilometres (212 mi)
- Apogee altitude: 356 kilometres (221 mi)
- Inclination: 51.6 degrees
- Period: 92 minutes

Docking with ISS
- Docking port: PMA-2 (Harmony forward)
- Docking date: February 10, 2010, 05:26 UTC
- Undocking date: February 20, 2010, 00:54 UTC
- Time docked: 9 days, 19 hours, 28 minutes
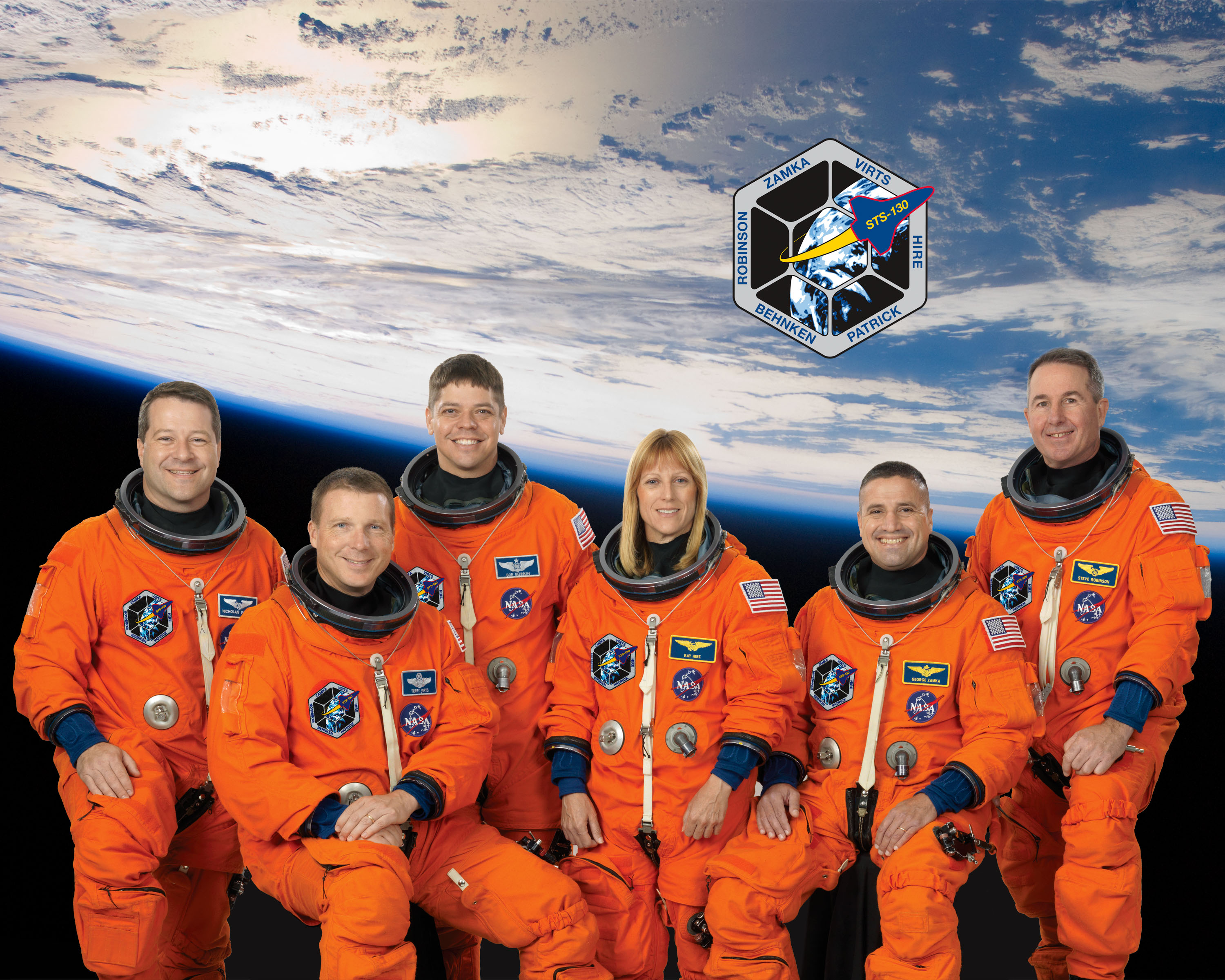
- Seated (l–r) Virts and Zamka. Standing (l–r) are Patrick, Behnken, Hire and Robinson. Space Shuttle program

STS-130 (ISS assembly flight 20A) was a NASA Space Shuttle mission to the International Space Station (ISS). Space Shuttle Endeavour's primary payloads were the Tranquility module and the Cupola, a robotic control station with six windows around its sides and another in the center, providing a 360-degree view around the station. Endeavour launched at 04:14 EST (09:14 UTC) on February 8, 2010, and landed at 22:22 EST on February 21, 2010, on runway 15 at the Kennedy Space Center's Shuttle Landing Facility.

== Crew ==
Position	Astronaut
Commander	George D. Zamka; Second and last spaceflight
Pilot	Terry W. Virts Jr. First spaceflight
Mission Specialist 1	Kathryn P. Hire; Second and last spaceflight
Mission Specialist 2 Flight Engineer	Stephen Robinson; Fourth and last spaceflight
Mission Specialist 3	Nicholas Patrick; Second and last spaceflight
Mission Specialist 4	Robert L. Behnken; Second spaceflight

=== Crew seat assignments ===
Seat	Launch	Landing	Seats 1–4 are on the flight deck. Seats 5–7 are on the mid-deck.
1	Zamka		Seats 1–4 are on the flight deck. Seats 5–7 are on the mid-deck.
2	Virts		Seats 1–4 are on the flight deck. Seats 5–7 are on the mid-deck.
3	Hire		Seats 1–4 are on the flight deck. Seats 5–7 are on the mid-deck.
4	Robinson		Seats 1–4 are on the flight deck. Seats 5–7 are on the mid-deck.
5	Patrick		Seats 1–4 are on the flight deck. Seats 5–7 are on the mid-deck.
6	Behnken		Seats 1–4 are on the flight deck. Seats 5–7 are on the mid-deck.
7	Unused		Seats 1–4 are on the flight deck. Seats 5–7 are on the mid-deck.

== Mission payload ==
Location	Cargo	Mass
Bays 1–2	Orbiter Docking System; EMU 3004 / EMU 3005	1,800 kilograms (4,000 lb); ~260 kilograms (570 lb)
Bay 3P	Shuttle Power; Distribution Unit (SPDU)	~17 kilograms (37 lb)
Bay 7P	APC/SPDU	18 kilograms (40 lb)
Bay 7	Cupola	1,805 kilograms (3,979 lb)
Bays 8–12	Tranquility Node	13,004 kilograms (28,669 lb)
Starboard Sill	Orbiter Boom Sensor System	~382 kilograms (842 lb)
Port Sill	Canadarm 201	410 kilograms (900 lb)
	Total:	17,696 kilograms (39,013 lb)

STS-130 carried Tranquility and the Cupola to the International Space Station. Tranquility was manufactured at the Thales Alenia Space factory in Turin, Italy, and transported by aircraft to Florida. It arrived at the Kennedy Space Center Space Station Processing Facility on May 21, 2009. It is also known as Node 3, and was named by a NASA poll as Tranquility.

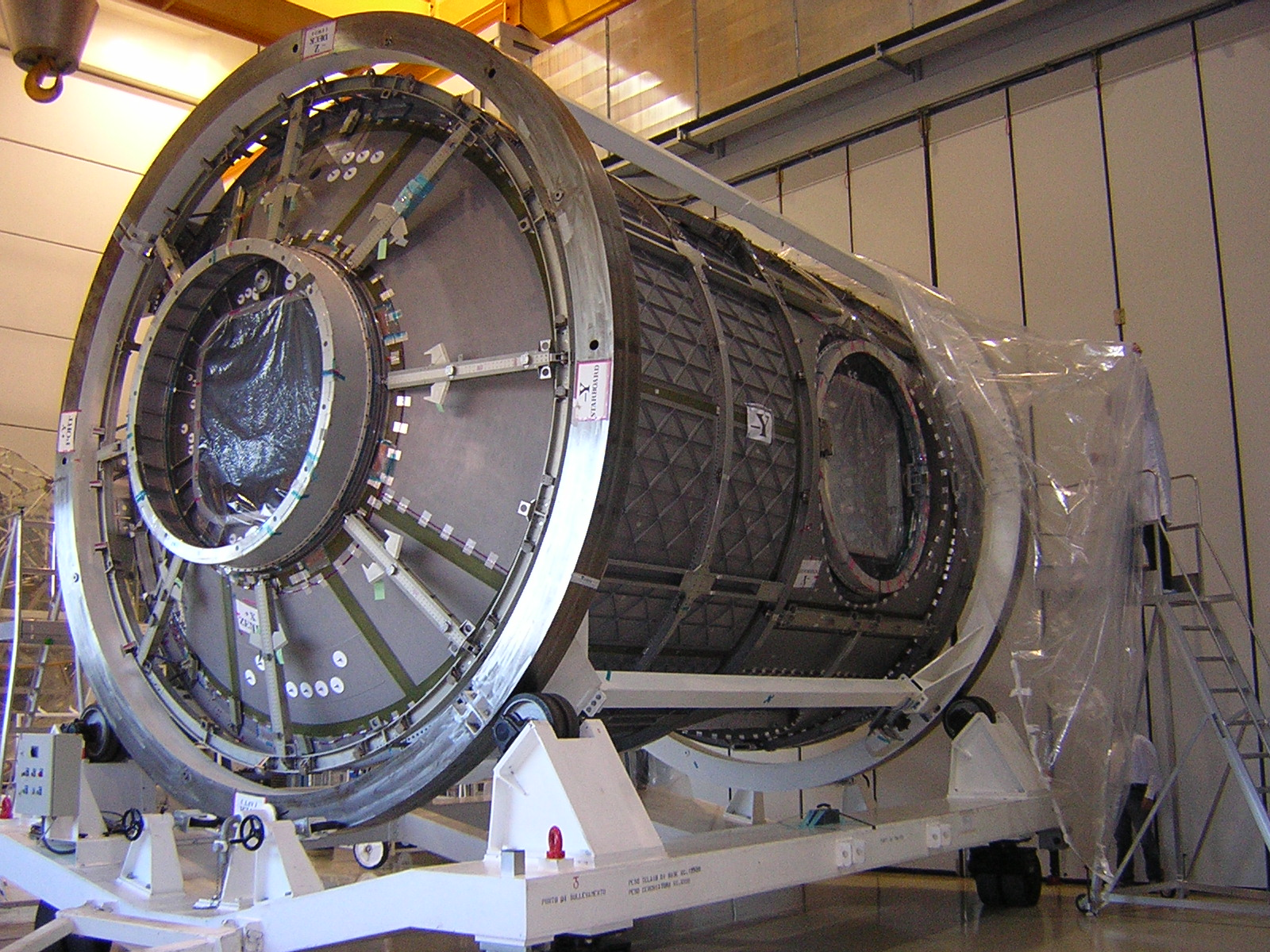
Node 3 at its factory in Italy. The structural steel hull is visible.

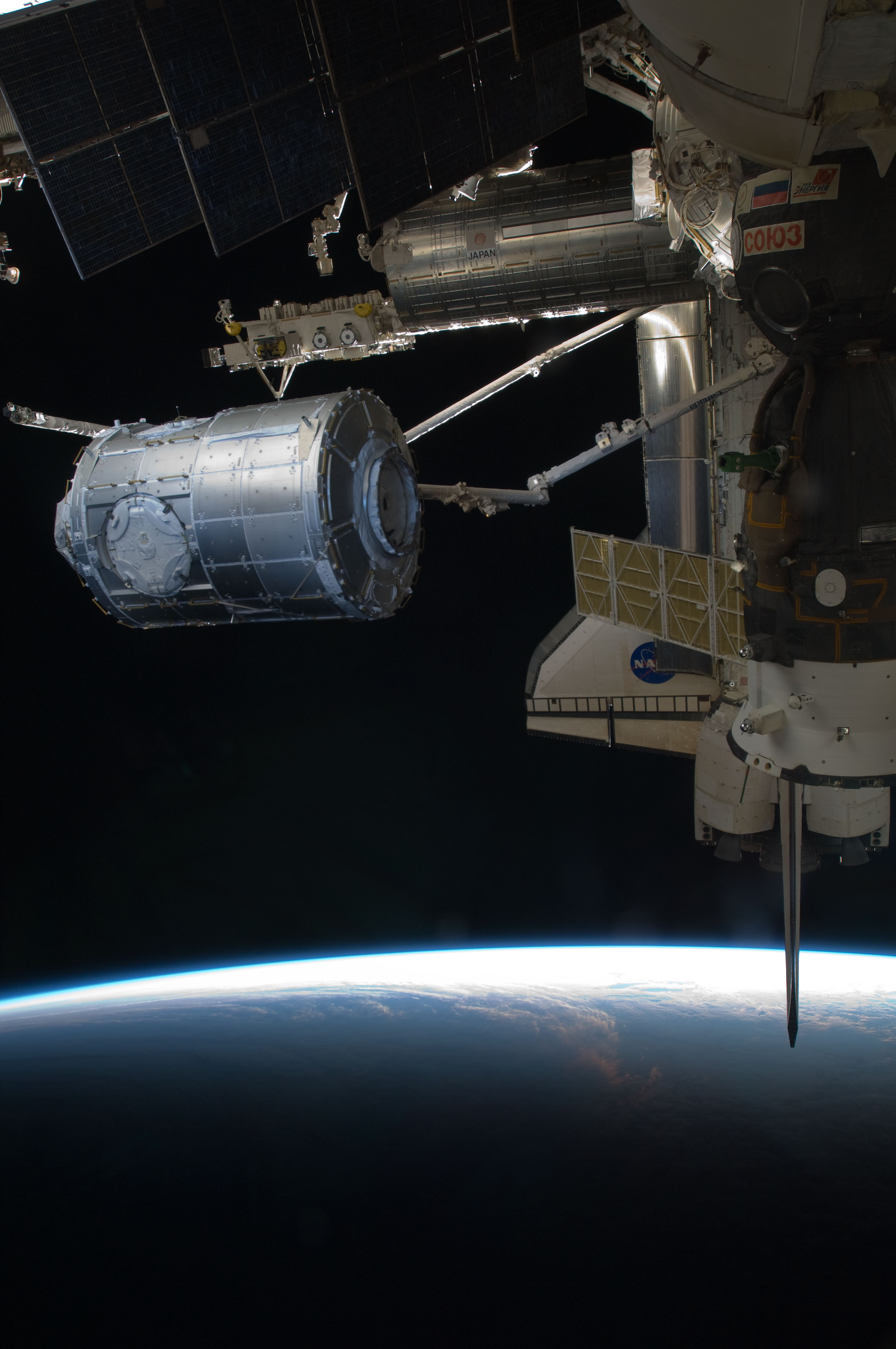
Tranquility during its move from Endeavour to the install position on the Unity node.

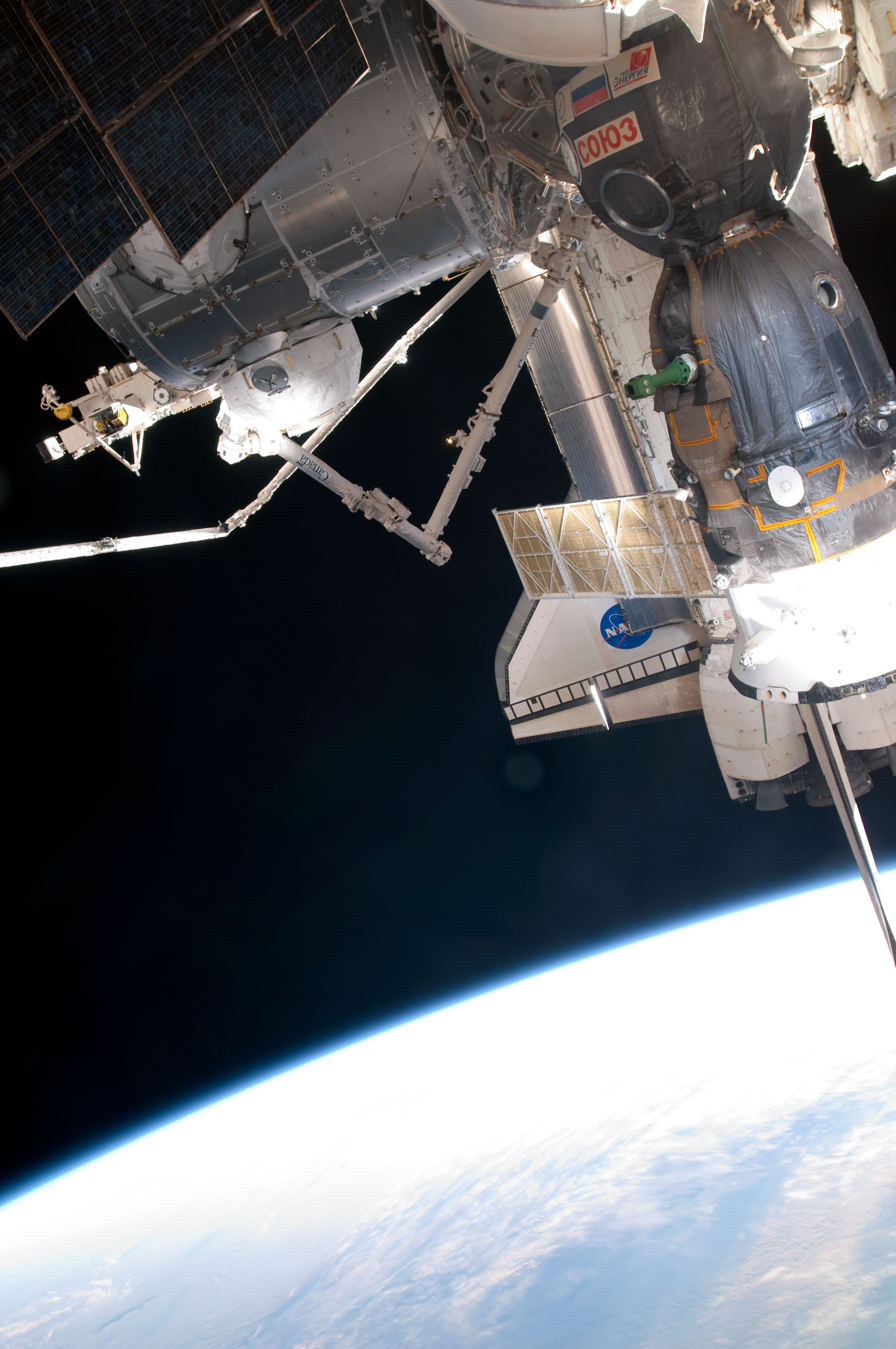
Cupola just after installation at Earth-facing port on Tranquility.

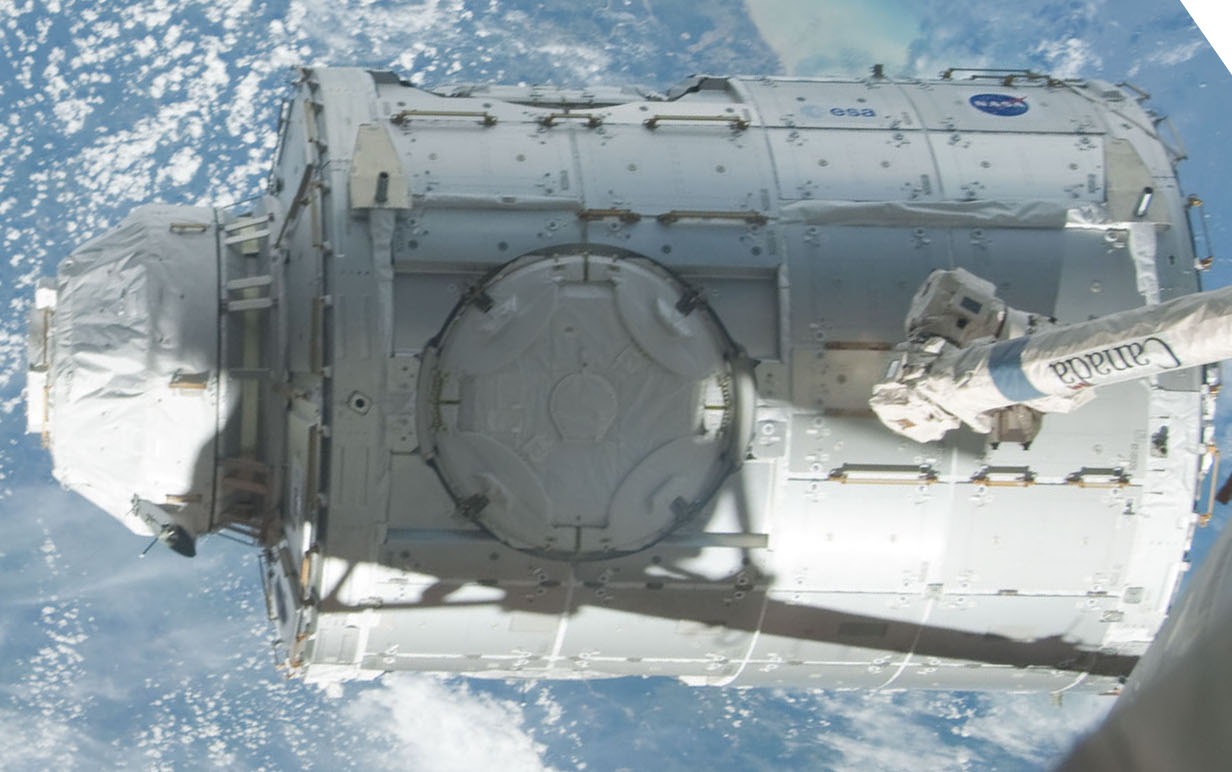
Tranquility with Cupola attached.

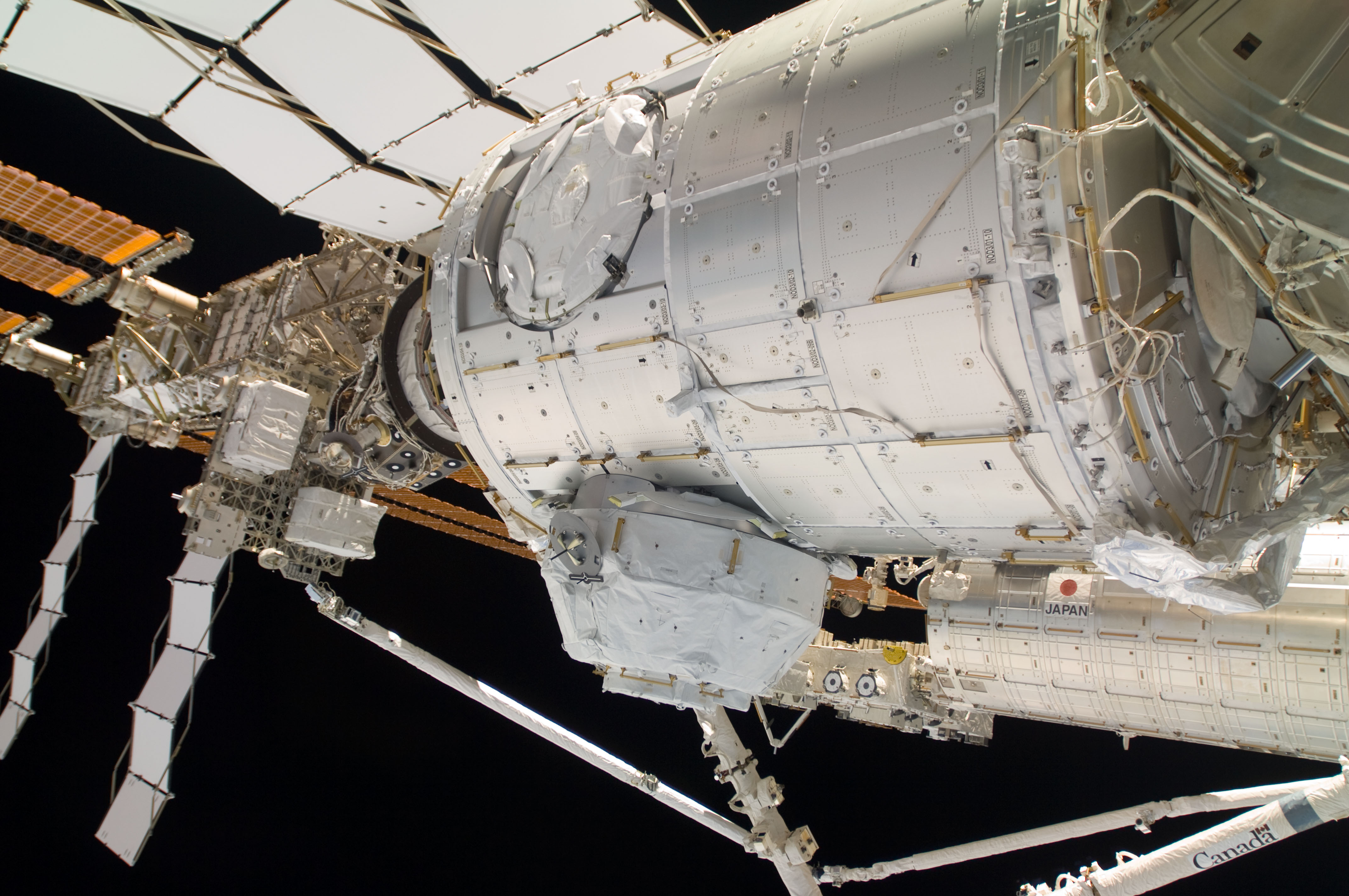
PMA-3 is moved to the end of Tranquility. Cupola is seen on top with its protective launch cover still attached.

== Shuttle processing ==
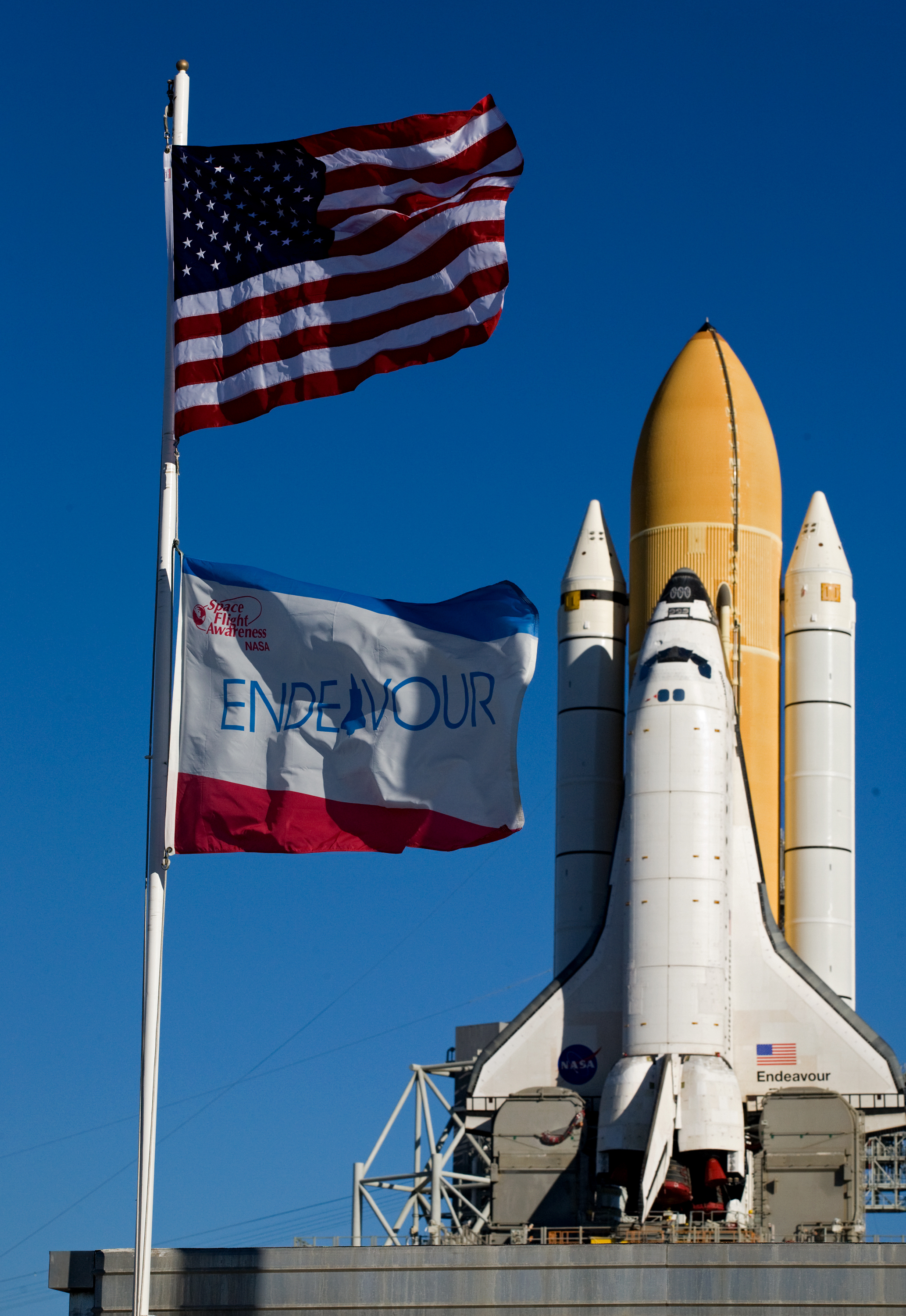
Endeavour arrives at Pad 39A on January 6, 2010, for the STS 130 mission.

Space Shuttle Endeavour was moved from her hangar in the Orbiter Processing Facility 2 to the Vehicle Assembly Building High bay 1 on December 11, 2009. Roll over began at 13:00 EST and was completed 1 hour and 5 minutes later at 14:05 EST.

Endeavour moved from the Vehicle Assembly Building to launch pad 39A. The process started at 04:13 EST on January 6, 2010. Before rolling out to the launch pad, engineers at Kennedy Space Center had an extended preparation time to get Endeavour ready to move to the launch pad due to the unusually cold weather. The 3.4 miles (5.5 km) was completed at 10:37 EST. The trip took 6hrs 24min.

=== Launch attempts ===
The first launch attempt was scheduled for 04:39:00 EST February 7, 2010, with forecasters originally predicting a 70% chance of favorable launch weather conditions at the Kennedy Space Center, but that degraded to 30% hours before the planned launch due to low clouds. The launch was scrubbed. The second launch attempt was successful at 04:14:08 EST (9:14:08 UTC) February 8, 2010.

Attempt	Planned	Result	Turnaround	Reason	Decision point	Weather go (%)	Notes
1	7 Feb 2010, 4:39:50 am	Scrubbed	—	Weather	7 Feb 2010, 4:30 am (T−9:00 Hold)	70% – 30%	Clouds at RTLS abort landing site.
2	8 Feb 2010, 4:14:08 am	Success	0 days 23 hours 34 minutes			60%	

== Mission milestones ==
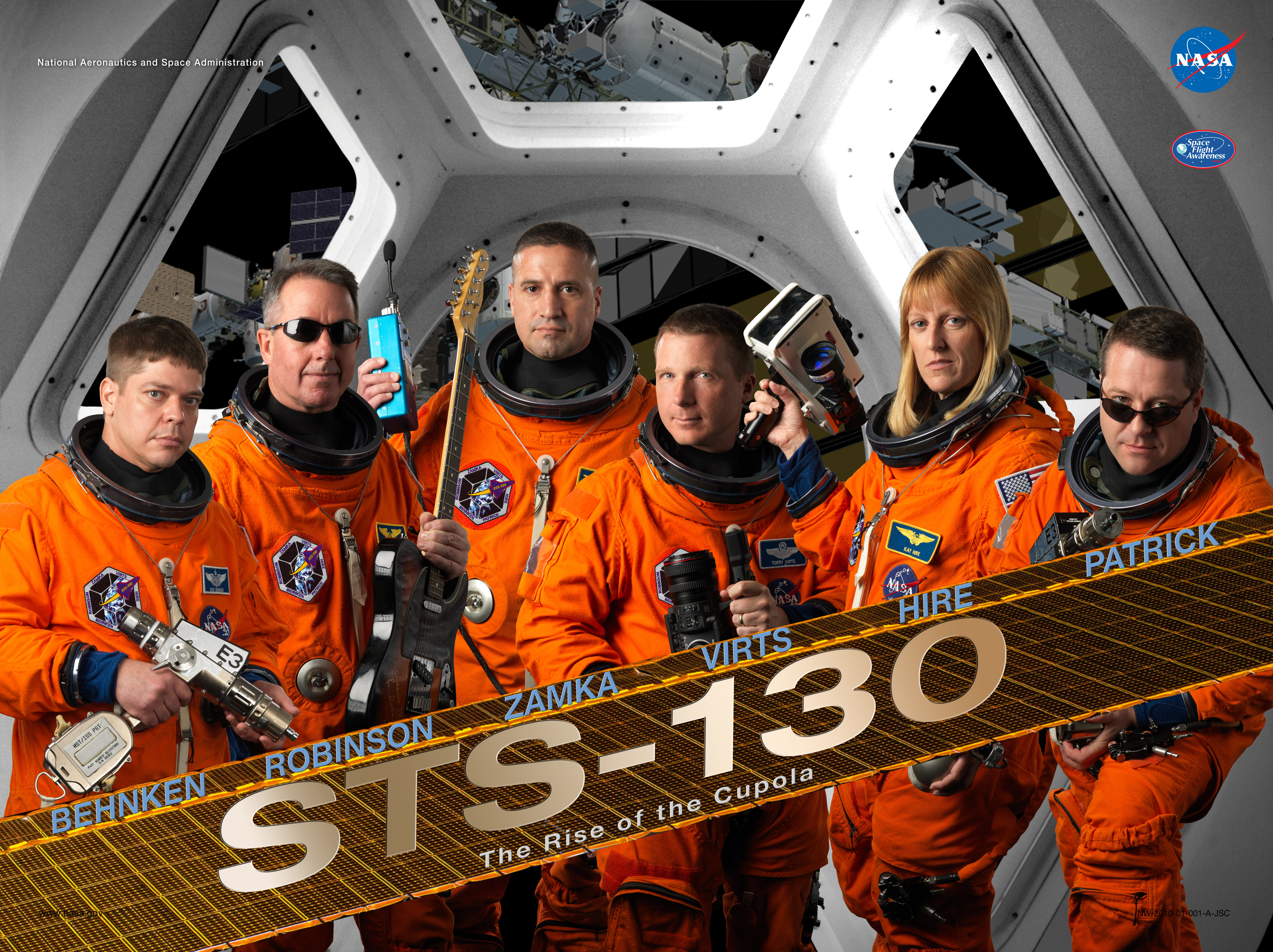
Mission poster

The mission marked:

- 161st NASA crewed space flight
- 130th shuttle mission since STS-1
- 24th flight of Endeavour
- 32nd shuttle mission to the ISS
- 10th flight of Endeavour to the ISS
- 1st shuttle flight in 2010
- 105th post-Challenger mission
- 17th post-Columbia mission
- 34th night launch of a shuttle, 21st night launch from launch pad 39A

== Mission timeline ==
=== February 8 (Flight Day 1: Launch) ===
Launch video (10 min 12 secs)

Endeavour launched successfully at 4:14:08 EST (9:14:08 UTC). When Endeavour lifted off, the space station was traveling about 212 miles over western Romania. Once in orbit the crew opened the payload bay doors, activated the radiators and deployed the K_{u} band antenna. Nick Patrick and Kay Hire then proceeded to activate, did a check out of the Shuttle Robotic Arm (SRMS) and then conducted a survey of the payload bay. The crew was also successful in down-linking imagery and video of the external tank to the ground.

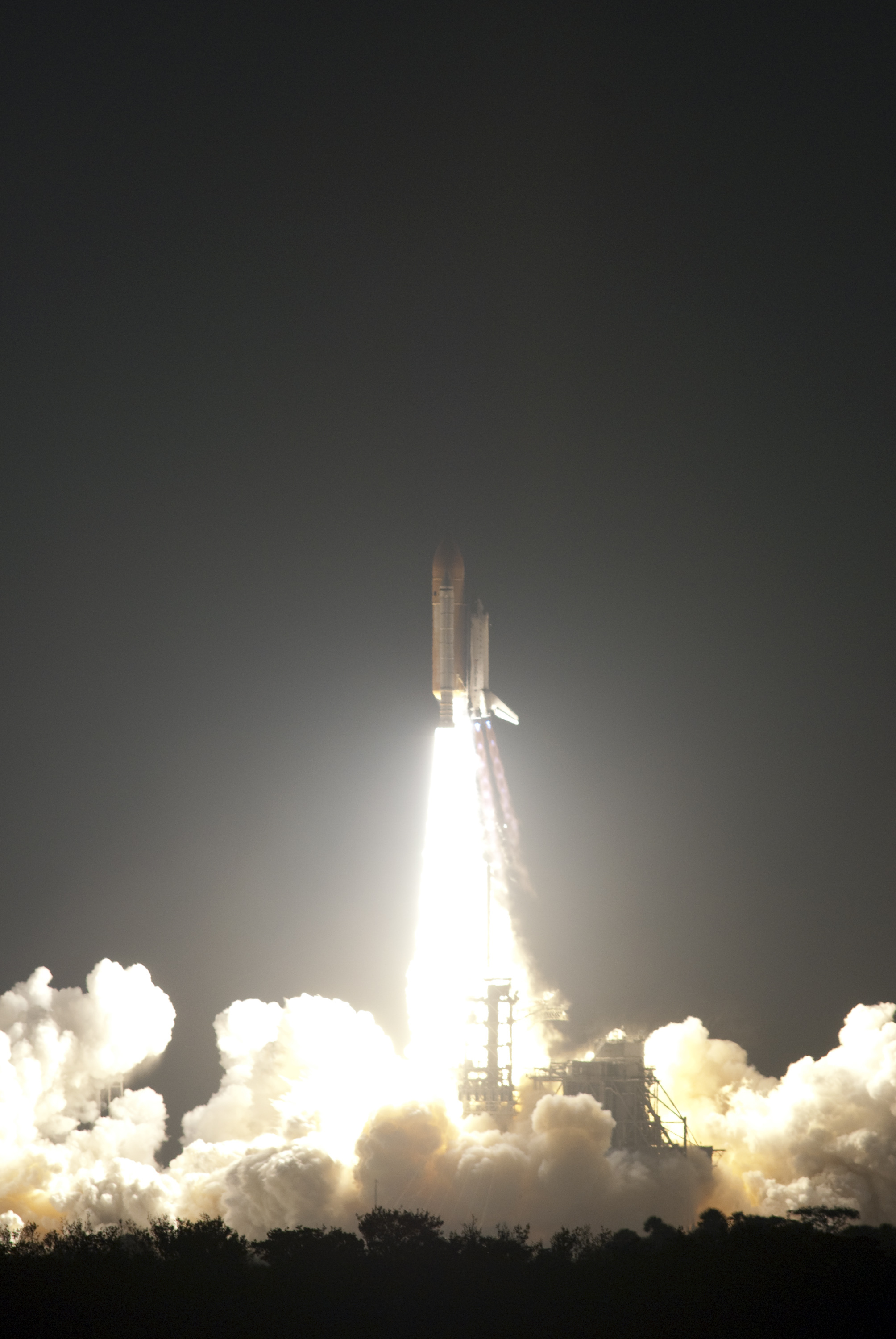
Space Shuttle Endeavour launches from Kennedy Space Center, 8 February 2010.

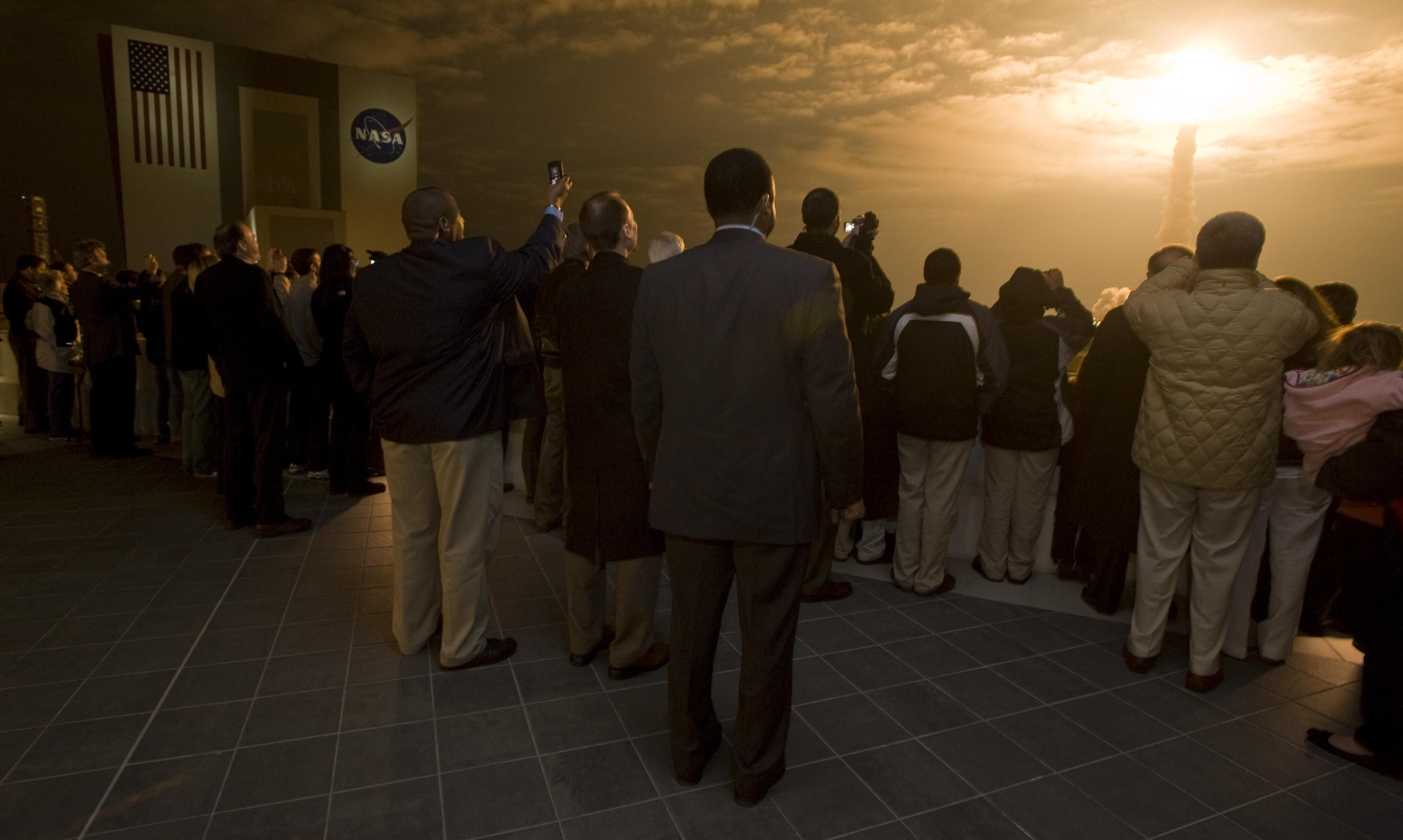
Guests look on from the terrace of Operations Support Building II during the launch.

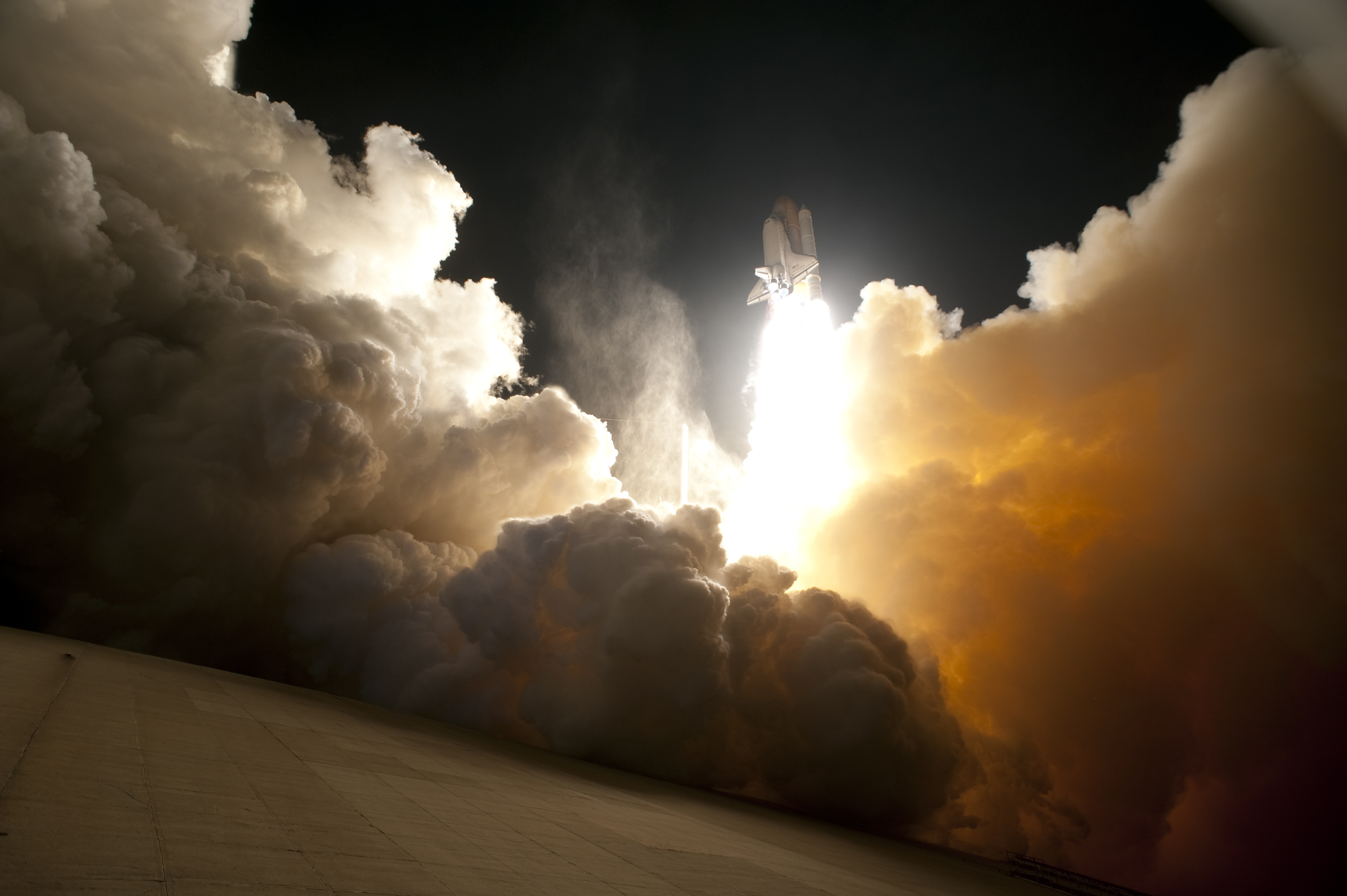
An exhaust cloud engulfs Launch Pad 39A during the launch.

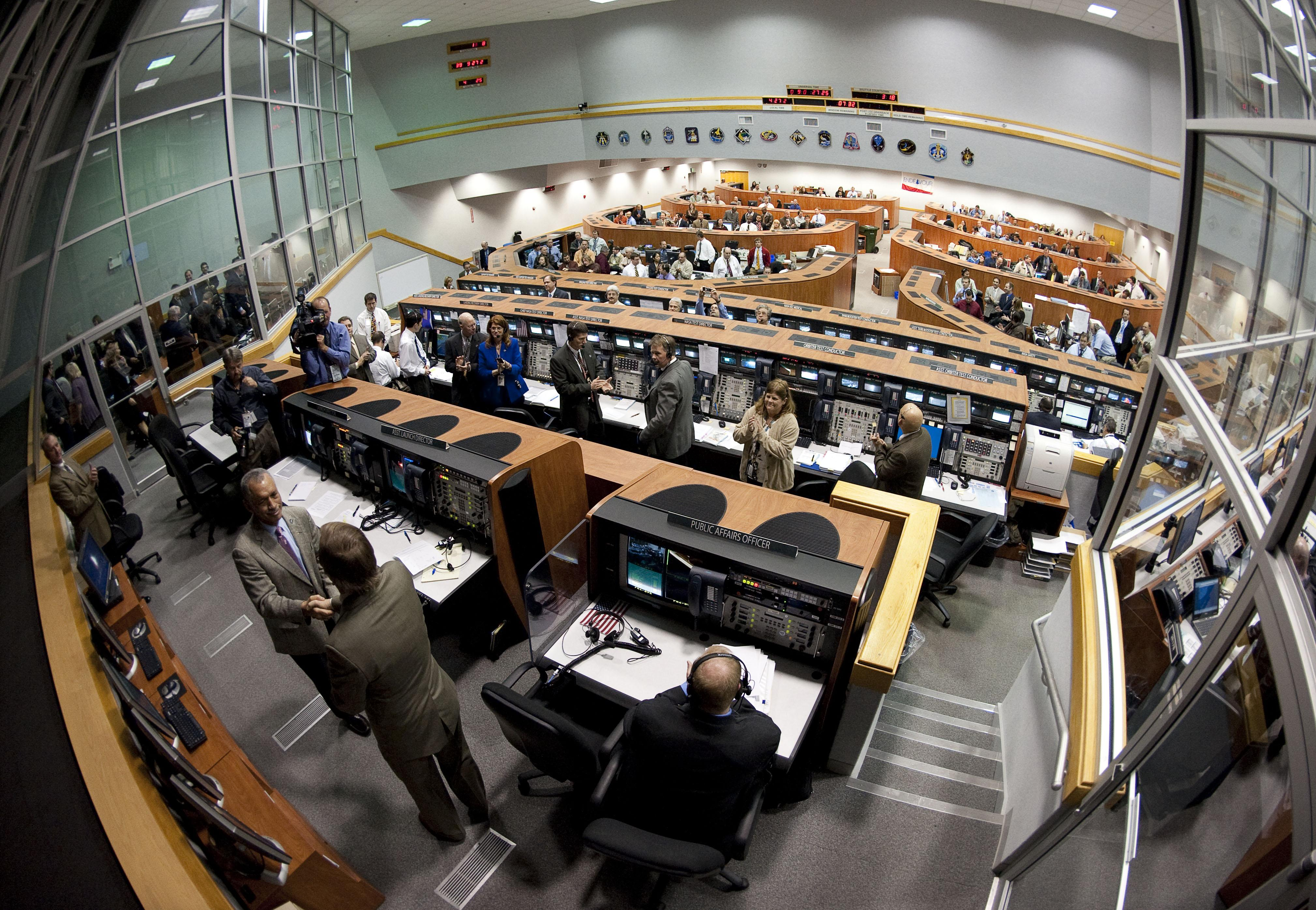
Bolden, left, congratulates Leinbach and the launch team in Firing Room Four of the Launch Control Center for a successful launch.

=== February 9 (Flight Day 2) ===
Most of the crew day was spent on conducting the standard inspection of the thermal protection system (TPS). All six of the crew members participated at one point during this task. Once the inspection process had moved to the port wing, astronauts Bob Behnken and Nick Patrick began working on checking out and preparing the spacesuits that will be used during the mission's three spacewalks. Once the survey of the TPS was complete, Stephen Robinson and Kay Hire, with Bob Behnken joining once his spacesuit tasks were complete, began checking out and preparing the tools that will be used during the rendezvous with the International Space Station (ISS). These tools include a hand-held LIDAR gun used for finding out the closing rate of the shuttle and distance from the ISS, the Orbiter Docking System (ODS) which is the part of the shuttle that connects to the space station and a centerline camera in the ODS to assist the commander George Zamka during docking.

=== February 10 (Flight Day 3: Rendezvous with ISS) ===
During the first part of the crew's workday, they performed a series of burns to catch up and dock with the International Space Station (ISS). Once the shuttle was 600 feet (180 m) below the ISS, commander George Zamka began what is known as the Rendezvous Pitch Maneuver (RPM). During the maneuver, ISS commander Jeff Williams and flight engineer Oleg Kotov took photos of the shuttle's thermal protection system (TPS). Space Shuttle Endeavour docked with the ISS at 5:26 UTC (00:06 EST). After completing leak checks the hatches between both vehicles were opened at 6:26 UTC (1:26 EST). The joint Expedition 22/STS-130 crew conducted the standard welcome ceremony and then conducted their safety brief. Once that was complete commander George Zamka, Bob Behnken and Steve Robinson began transferring the spacesuits Behnken and Nick Patrick will use for the three spacewalks. Also during this time Nick Patrick and ISS flight engineer T.J. Creamer picked up the OBSS boom and handed it off to the Space Shuttle robot arm using the station's SSRMS or Canadarm2. The shuttle arm was operated by Kay Hire and pilot Terry Virts.

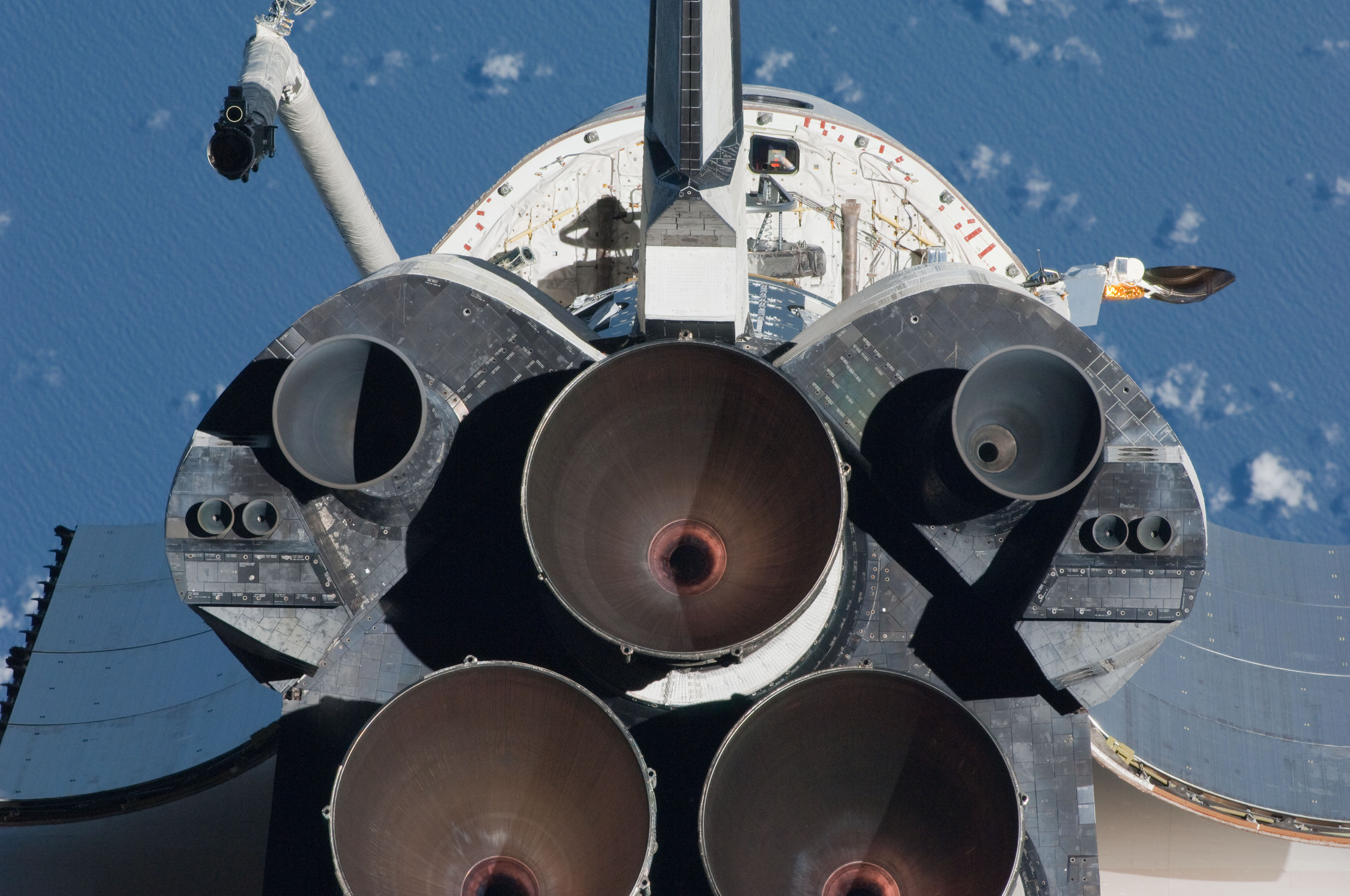
Image of Endeavour's aft section taken during the shuttle's approach prior to docking.

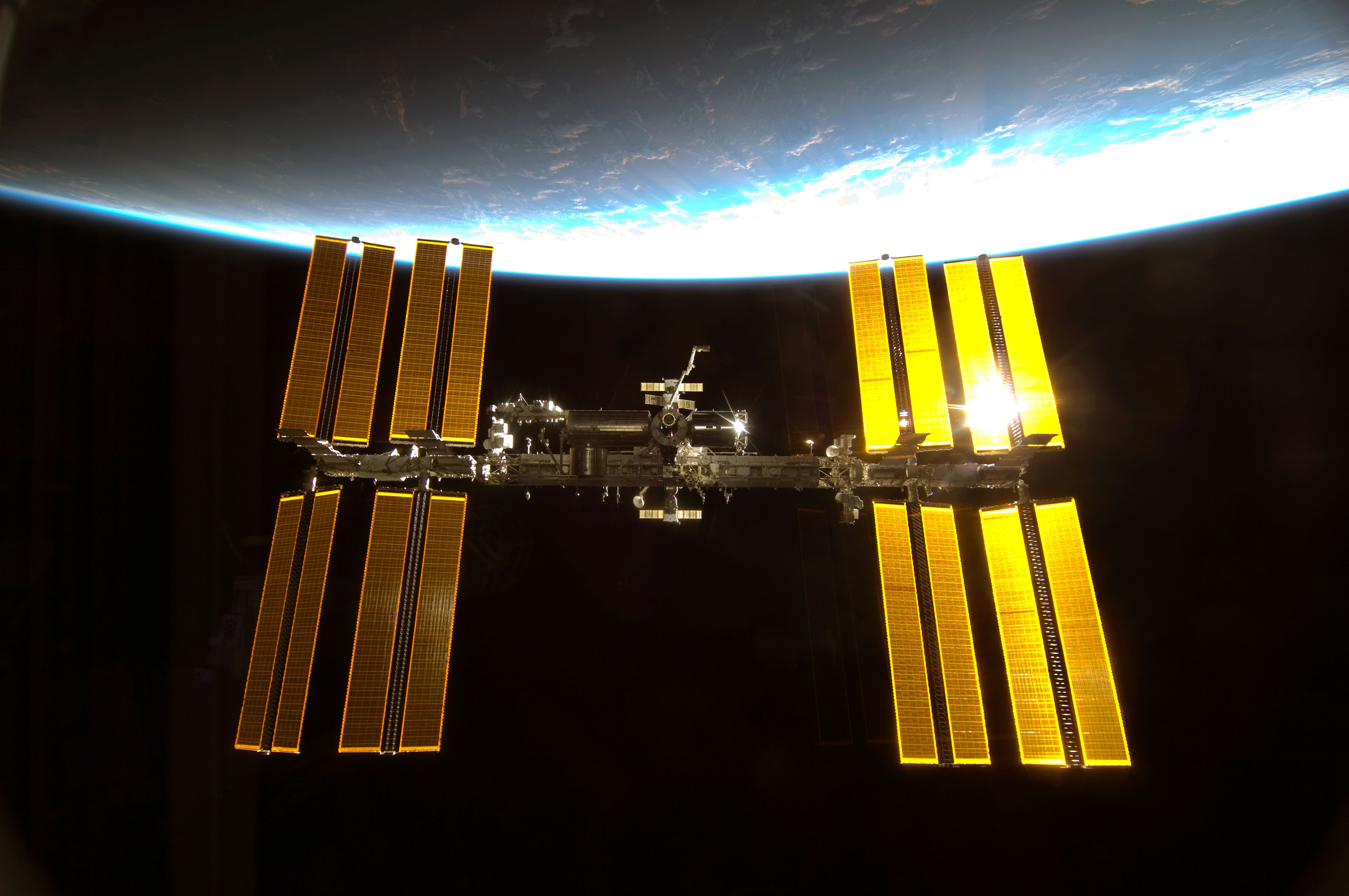
Space Station as photographed by a shuttle crew member.

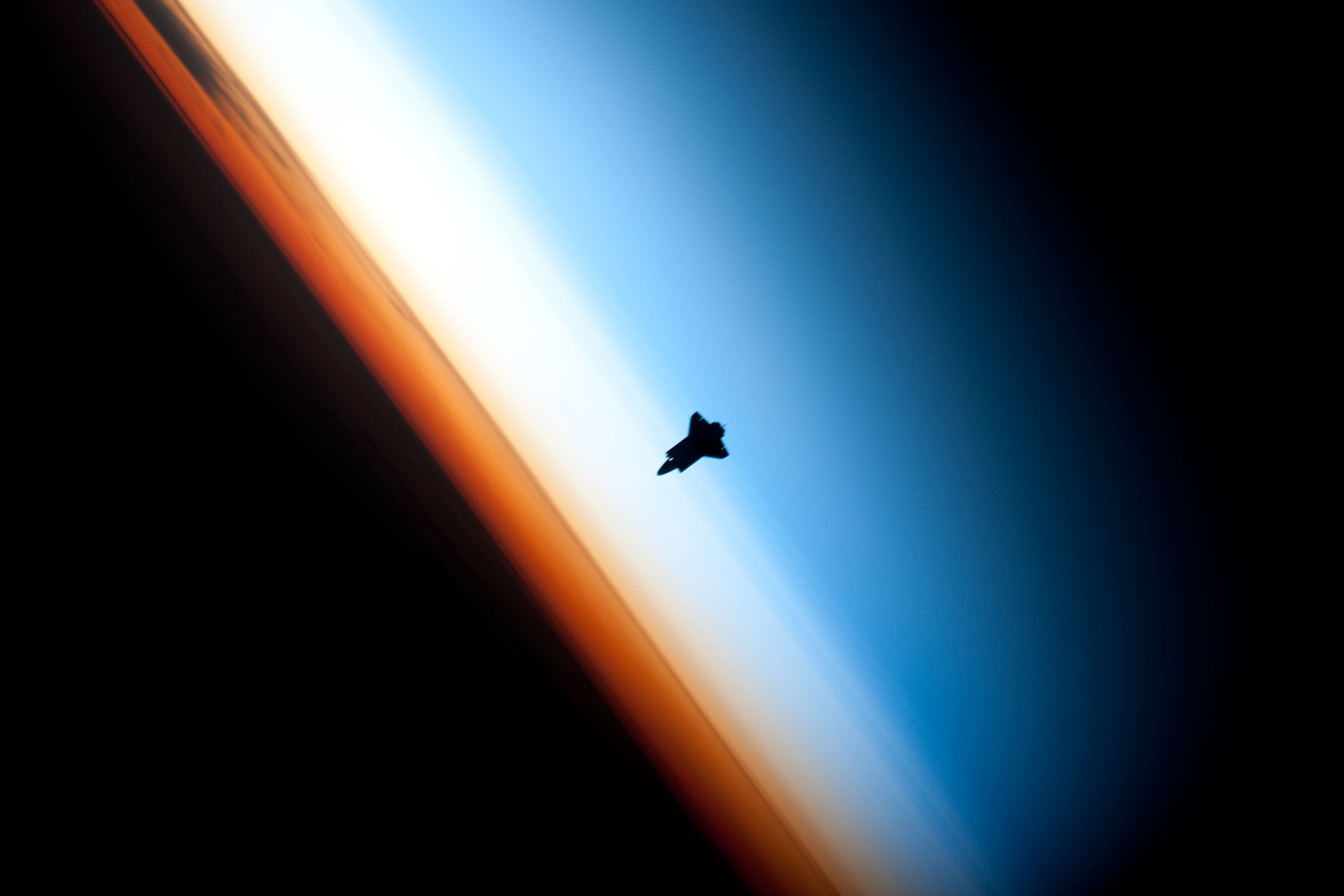
Endeavour approaches the ISS, silhouetted by the Earth's horizon.

=== February 11 (Flight Day 4: Spacewalk 1 preparation) ===
Flight day 4 saw Nick Patrick and Bob Behnken get all the tools they need ready for their spacewalk on flight day 5. While Patrick and Behnken were getting the tools ready, commander George Zamka and ISS flight engineer Soichi Noguchi swapped out the Hard Upper Torso (HUT) on Bob Behnken's suit, since the original HUT had developed a problem with a wire harness and was not powering the Wireless Video System (WVS) or the heaters in his gloves and boots. Once the swap was complete, Zamka and Noguchi tested the suit successfully. The crew also performed a number of transfer related activities during the morning of their work day. After a joint meal together, the crew of STS-130 and ISS commander Jeff Williams and flight engineer T.J. Creamer conducted a PAO event with television stations in Sacramento, California, Mobile, Alabama and a radio station in St. Louis, Missouri. Once the PAO event was finished, the joint crews had some off duty time for the rest of the day. Before the two crews went to bed they conducted a spacewalk procedures review, then got Nick Patrick and Bob Behnken into the Quest Airlock. Behnken and Patrick spent the night there at 10.2 psi instead of at the station's 14.6 psi, breathing pure oxygen for an hour before and after their sleep period in order to prevent decompression sickness.

=== February 12 (Flight Day 5: Spacewalk 1) ===
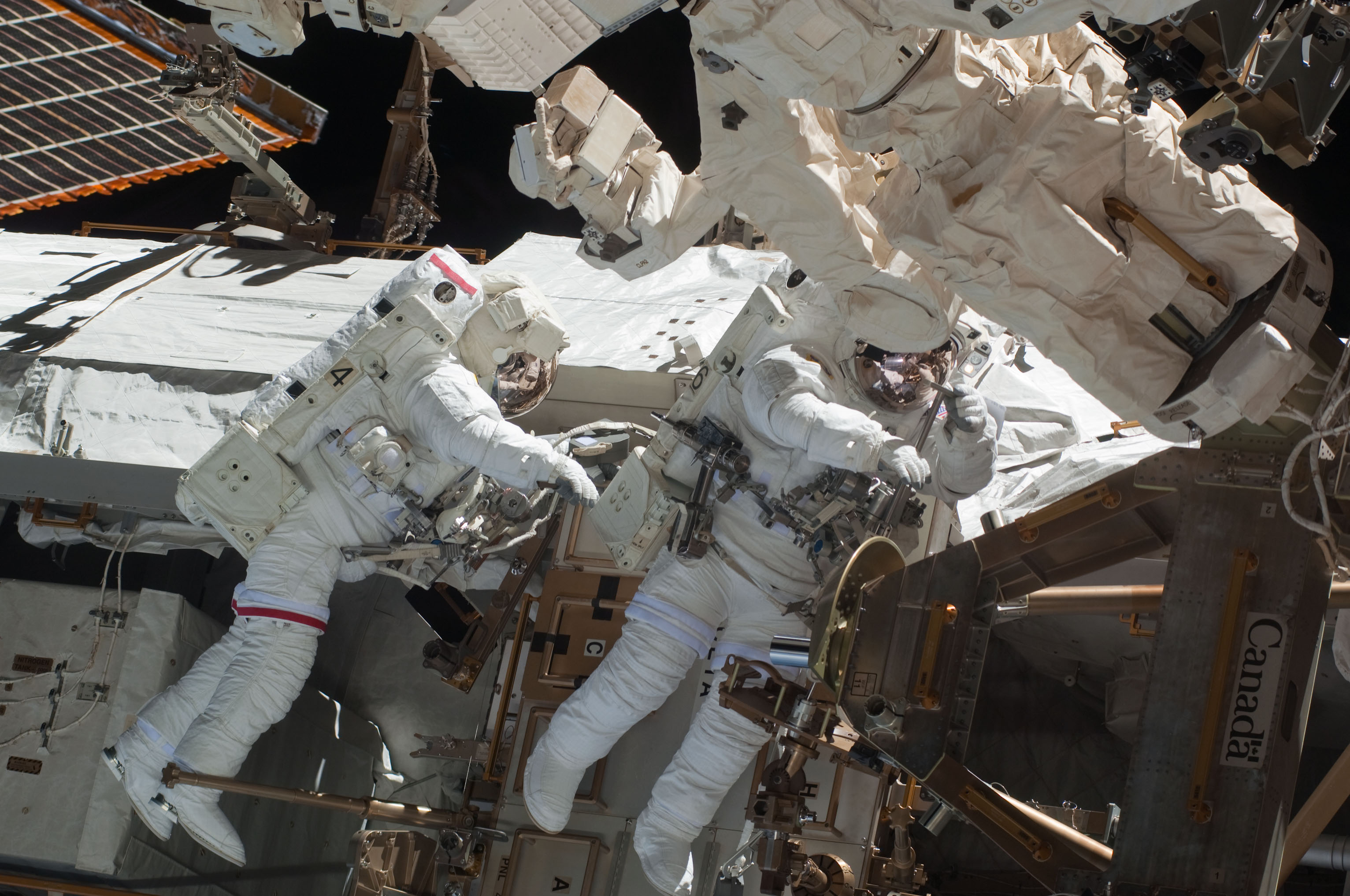
Astronauts Behnken and Patrick participate in the first spacewalk.

Flight day 5 saw astronauts Nick Patrick and Bob Behnken perform the mission's first spacewalk, which began on time at 02:17 UTC. Their first task was to move the payload bay of Endeavour and prepare and release launch locks on the Tranquility module and Cupola. Once Behnken and Patrick were clear of its path, the Tranquility module was moved to the port side of the Unity node using the space station's robot arm. Before Tranquility was installed the spacewalkers removed Dextre's ORU platform and secured it to one of the truss segments to function as a backup for a platform to be installed on STS-132. Once the new module was in place, the spacewalkers proceeded to connect temporary heater and data cables between Unity and Tranquility. Behnken and Patrick were ahead of the timeline so they were also able to complete some get-ahead tasks. The spacewalk was completed six and a half hours later, on Friday, 08:49 UTC. After the spacewalk, other crew members completed transfer-related tasks. The transfers are now over halfway complete.

=== February 13 (Flight Day 6: Spacewalk 2 preparation) ===
On flight day 6 members of the joint crew opened the hatches to the new Tranquility module for the first time. STS-130 crew-members George Zamka, Terry Virts, Stephen Robinson and Kay Hire all helped in the initial outfitting of the node. During the initial outfitting, Terry Virts and Kay Hire prepared the Cupola for its move from the end of Node 3. While that was going on spacewalkers Bob Behnken and Nick Patrick re-sized and repaired Bob Behnken's original suit for use by Nick Patrick, after a small problem with a fan was discovered. Once that task was complete the pair began getting their tools ready for the second of three spacewalks. Throughout the day there were 2 PAO events, the first was a special event conducted by Capcom Mike Massimino. Massimino asked Bob Behnken and Nick Patrick questions he received through his Twitter account. Later in the day Kay Hire and Terry Virts took questions from the Associated Press, CBS News and Reuters. At the end of the day the whole crew conducted another EVA procedures review in preparation for EVA2.

=== February 14 (Flight Day 7: Spacewalk 2) ===
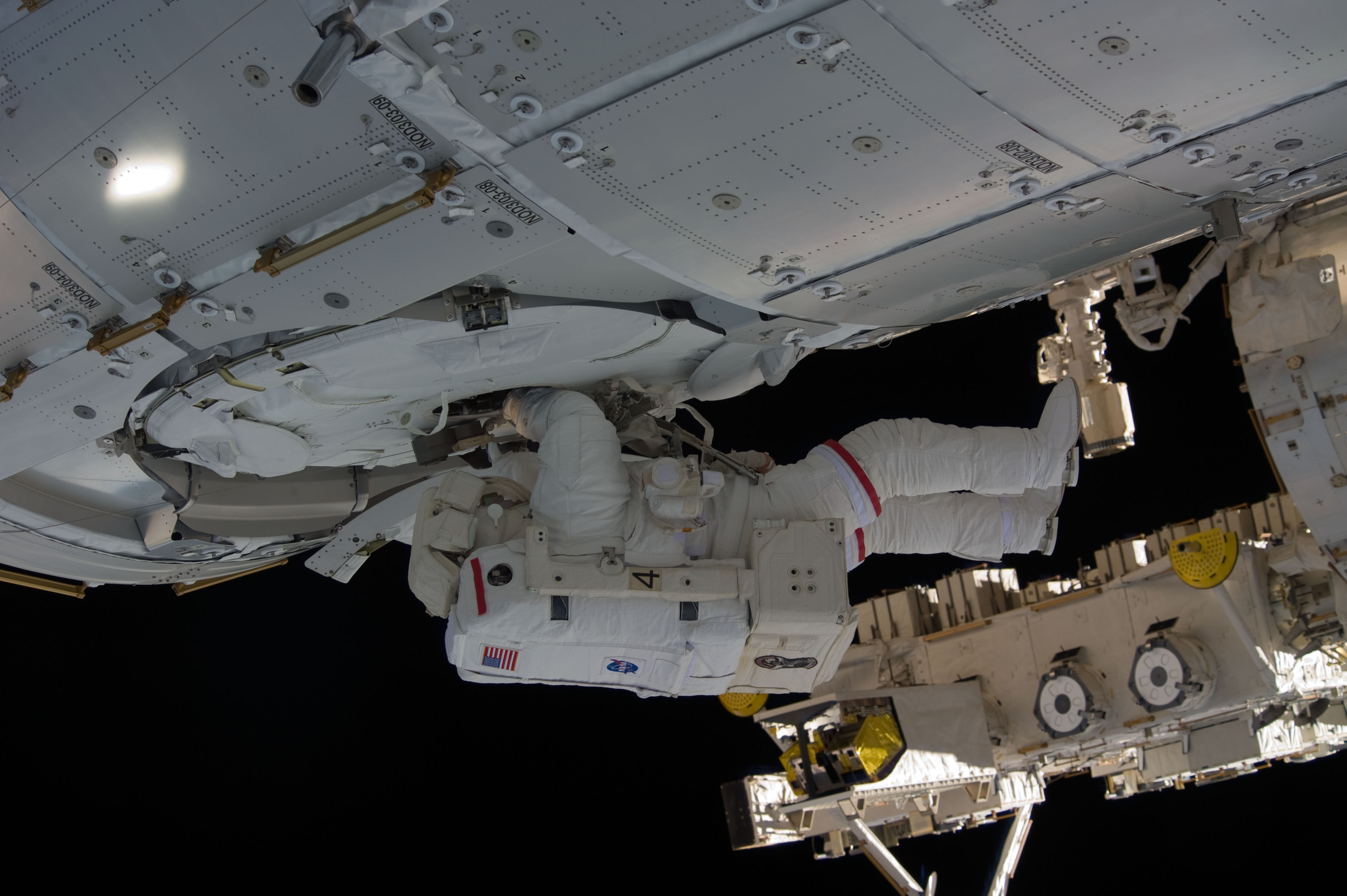
Robert Behnken participates in the second spacewalk.

The second of three spacewalks was completed on flight day 7. Bob Behnken and Nick Patrick were able to complete all their planned tasks in 5 hours and 54 minutes. The tasks included installing ammonia coolant loops, thermal blankets to protect the ammonia hoses, outfitting the Earth-facing port of Tranquility for the Cupola, install handrails and a non-propulsive vent valve (NPV). During the connection of one of the ammonia hoses, a small amount of ammonia leaked out of a quick disconnect valve and floated towards Nick Patrick. Procedures called for a "bake-out" while Patrick worked during the sunlit portion of the orbit, and a contamination test in the airlock. The bake-out happened at the end of the spacewalk. While the spacewalk was happening, Terry Virts and Kay Hire along with ISS commander Jeff Williams, Soichi Noguchi and T.J. Creamer, continued outfitting the Tranquility module. This included setting up the ventilation system, connecting electrical and computer cables and configuring racks. They confirmed lights and computers were on in the node once the ammonia cooling system had been activated. The crew also received word the mission had been extended by one day in the morning.

=== February 15 (Flight Day 8) ===
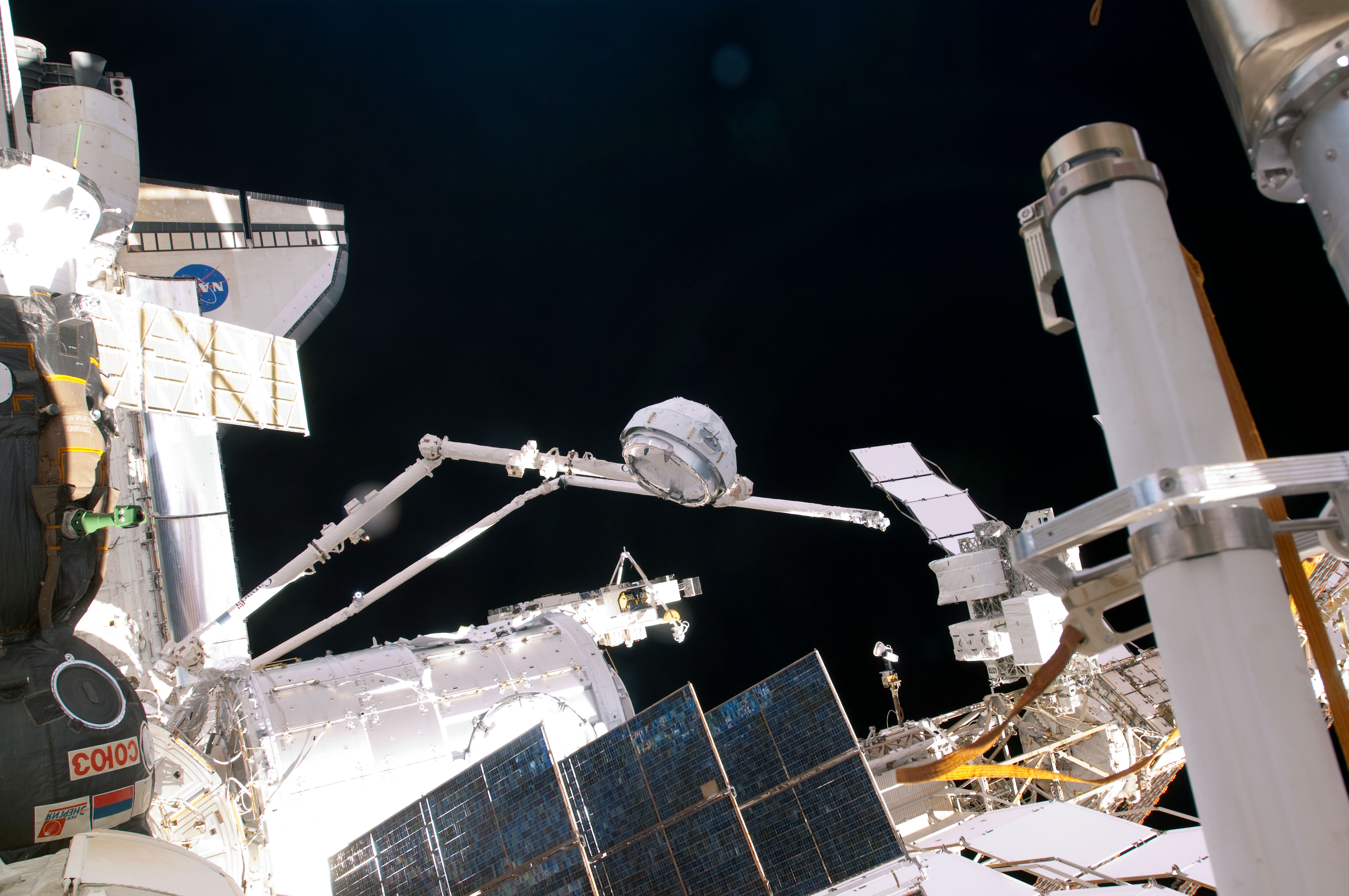
Cupola was moved by Canadarm2 from the forward port to the nadir port of Tranquility

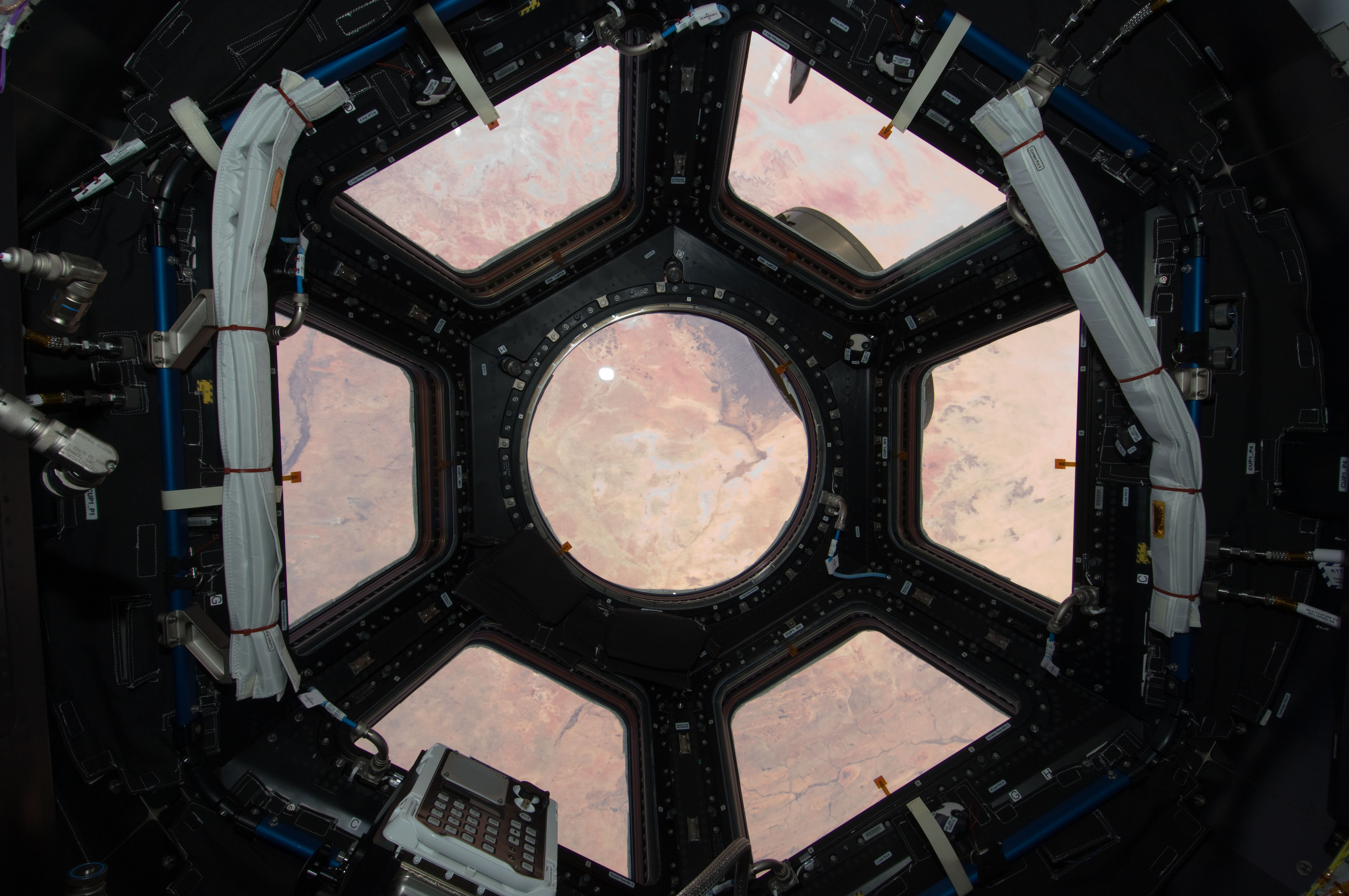
The first photograph taken in the Cupola, one of two ISS modules installed during STS-130

On flight day 8, the Cupola was successfully moved from its launch location to its permanent location on the Earth-facing side of Tranquility. Cupola was moved by the space station robot arm (SSRMS), which was operated by Kay Hire and Terry Virts. ISS commander Jeff Williams assisted them by releasing the bolts and hooks that held the Cupola in place and then securing it to its new home. The process was slightly delayed due to some bolts that were torqued tighter than expected on the ground, but flight controllers were able to increase the torque to release the bolts. Once the move of the Cupola was complete, outfitting continued to get the cupola ready. The crew will be able to ingress it tomorrow, but the window covers will not be opened until after the third and final spacewalk. While the Cupola relocation was going on, some of the crew members participated in transferring items between the shuttle and station. Also during this time Bob Behnken and Nick Patrick prepared the tools that they will use during the final spacewalk scheduled for flight day 10. During this time the pair re-sized another spacesuit on station for use by Behnken. This was done because the suit Behnken had been using had some problems with its communications equipment.

=== February 16 (Flight Day 9: Spacewalk 3 preparation) ===
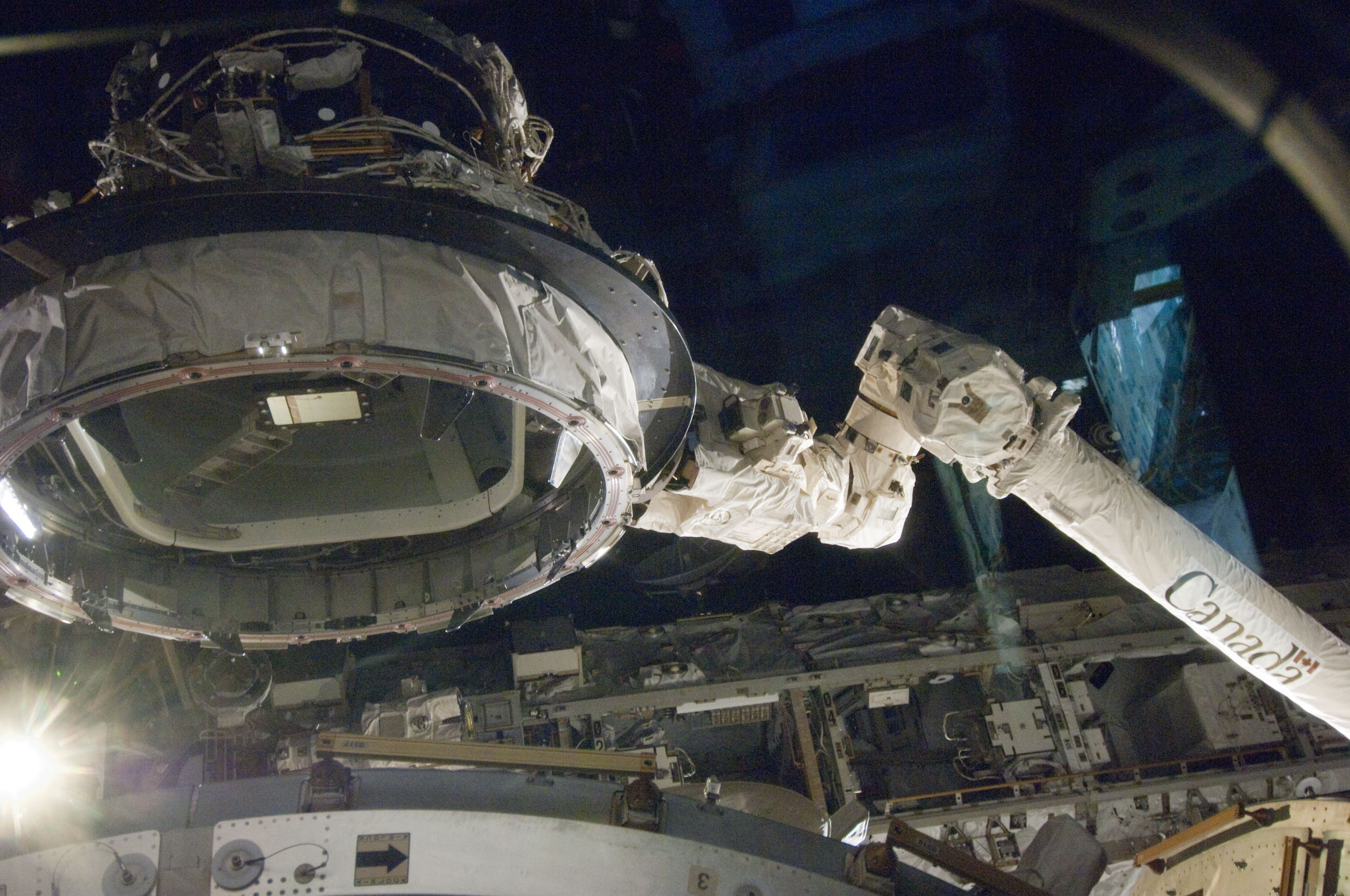
Relocation of PMA-3 to the end of Tranquility

Flight day 9 saw the relocation of Pressurized Mating Adapter 3 (PMA-3) from the Harmony node, where it was temporarily located, to the end of Tranquility, where it remained until 2017. The PMA will provide protection from micro-meteoroids and orbital debris. PMA-3 was moved by Bob Behnken and Nick Patrick, with help from Jeff Williams and Soichi Noguchi to release the PMA-3. During the PMA-3 relocation, Kay Hire and Terry Virts continued work on outfitting the Cupola. The joint Expedition 22/STS-130 crews enjoyed a meal together and had some off-duty time in the 2nd half of their day. Before the scheduled bedtime the entire crew conducted another EVA procedures review for the third and final EVA of the mission.

=== February 17 (Flight Day 10: Spacewalk 3) ===
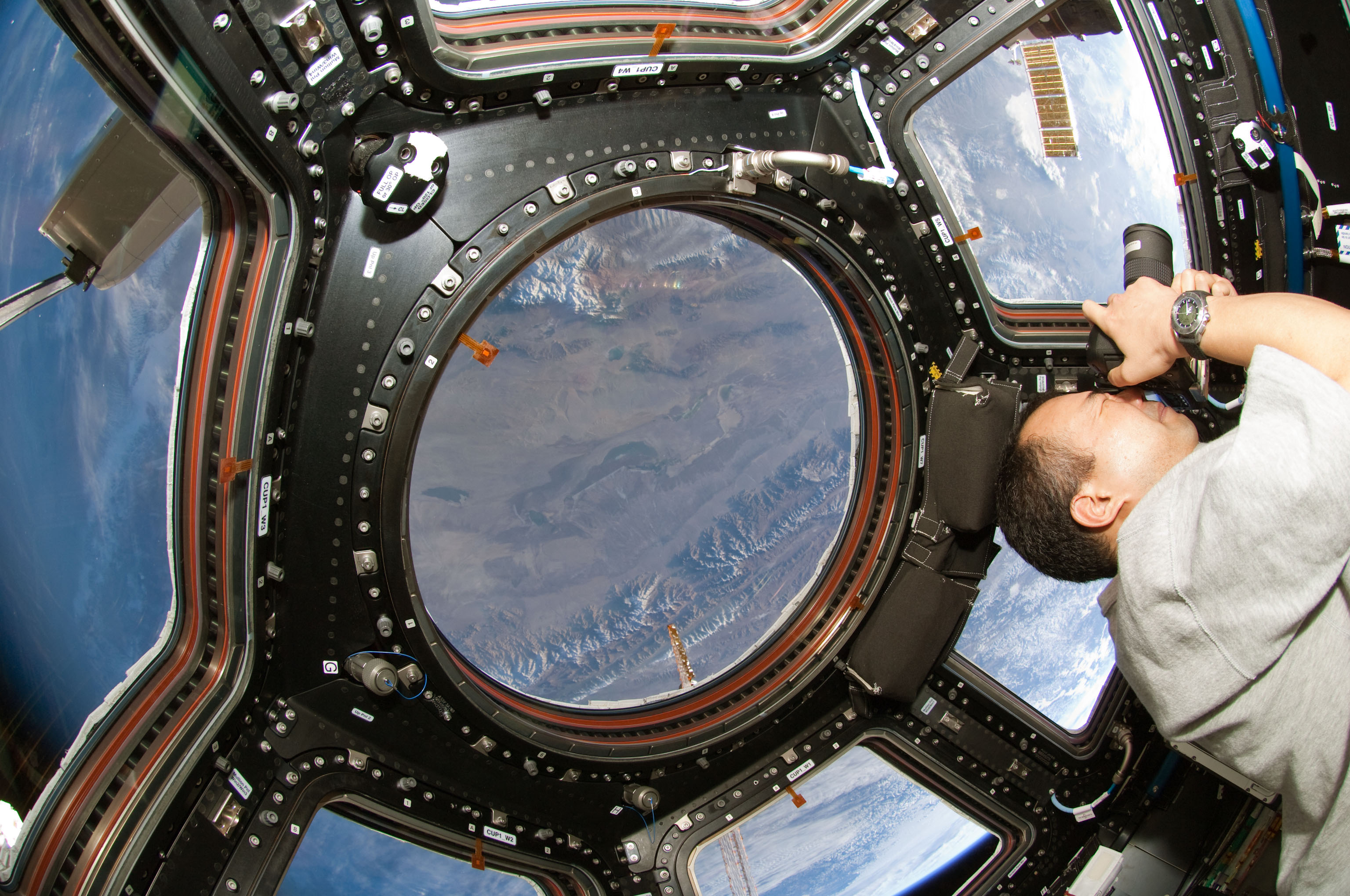
Expedition 22 member Soichi Noguchi photographs the interior of the newly installed Cupola module

On flight day 10, astronauts Bob Behnken and Nick Patrick completed the third and final spacewalk of the STS-130 mission. Their tasks included hooking up heater and data cables for PMA-3, removing thermal covers and launch locks on Cupola, and installing handrails on Tranquility and a video cable for another base to be installed on the Russian segment of the ISS. Bob Behnken also connected the second ammonia cooling loop and disconnected a temporary power cable on Tranquility. Once the launch locks were removed, pilot Terry Virts opened the windows on Cupola for the first time. During the day Kay Hire and Terry Virts hooked up and transferred the Cupola robotics station for its use in the future. Terry Virts also completed some transfer tasks in the morning.

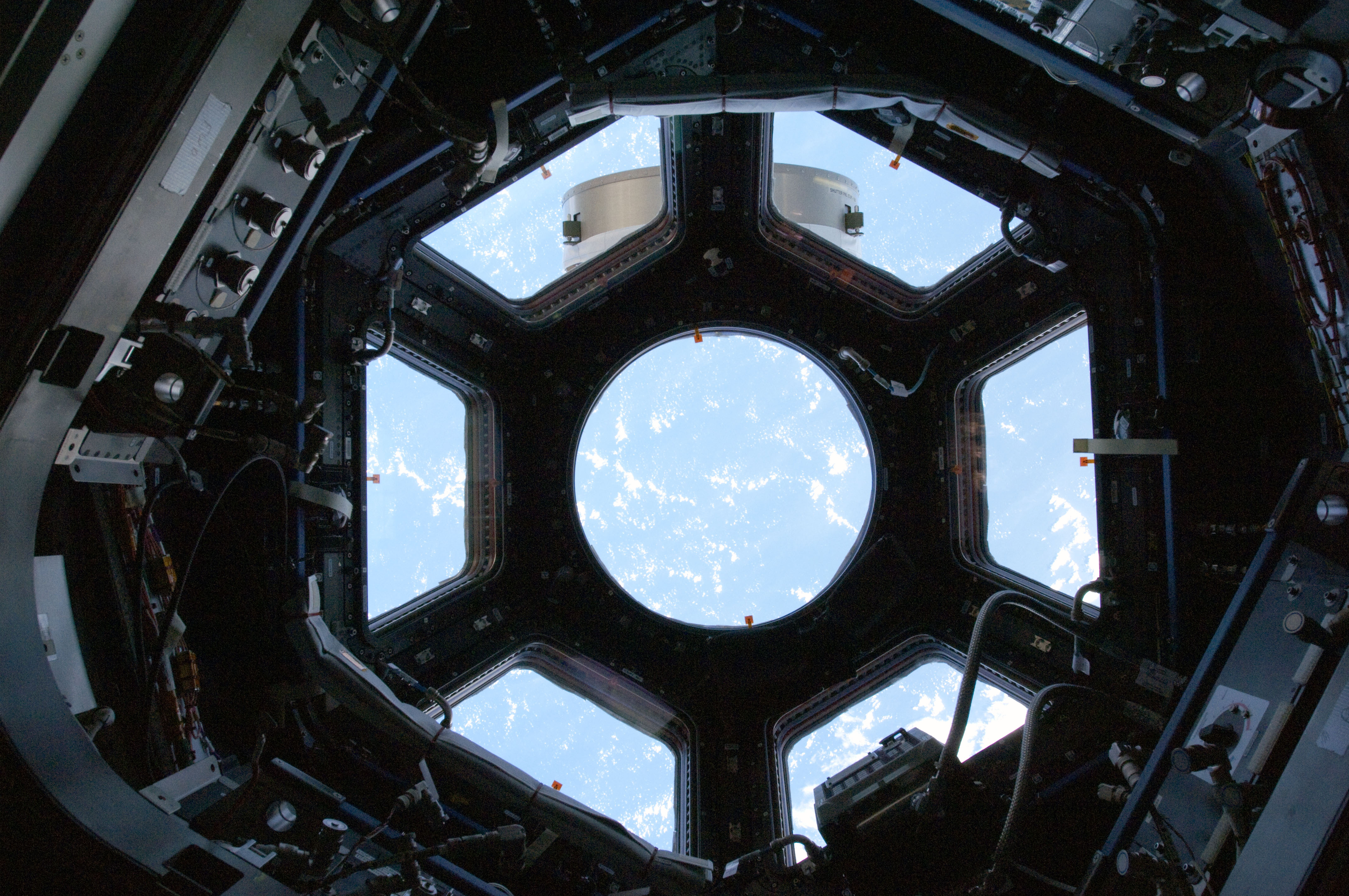
An image taken through the Cupola

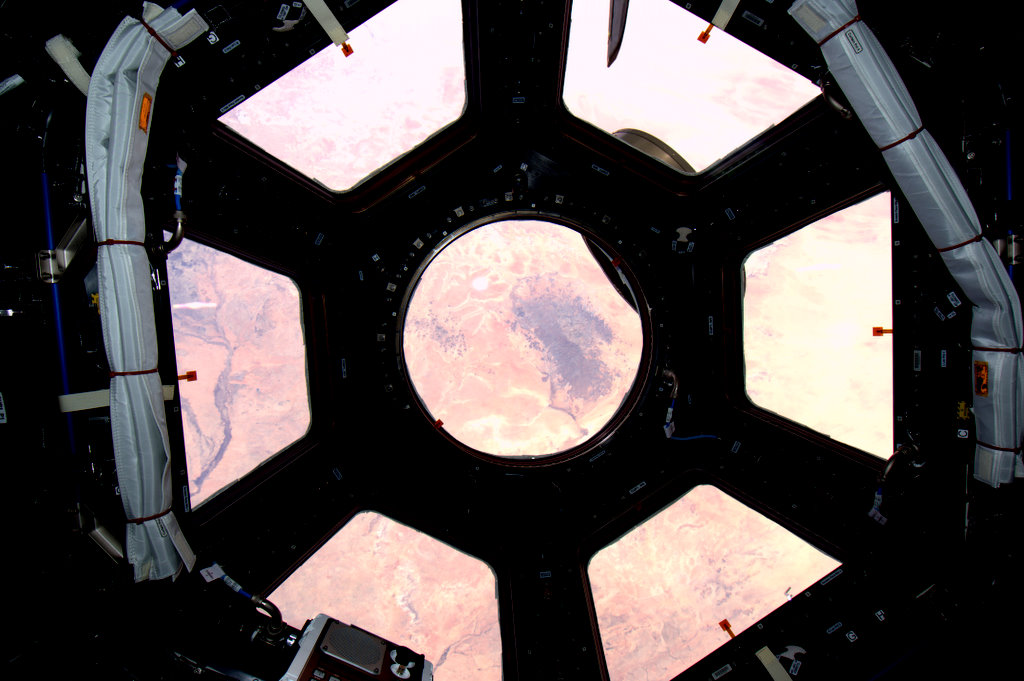
Cupola open towards the Sahara desert

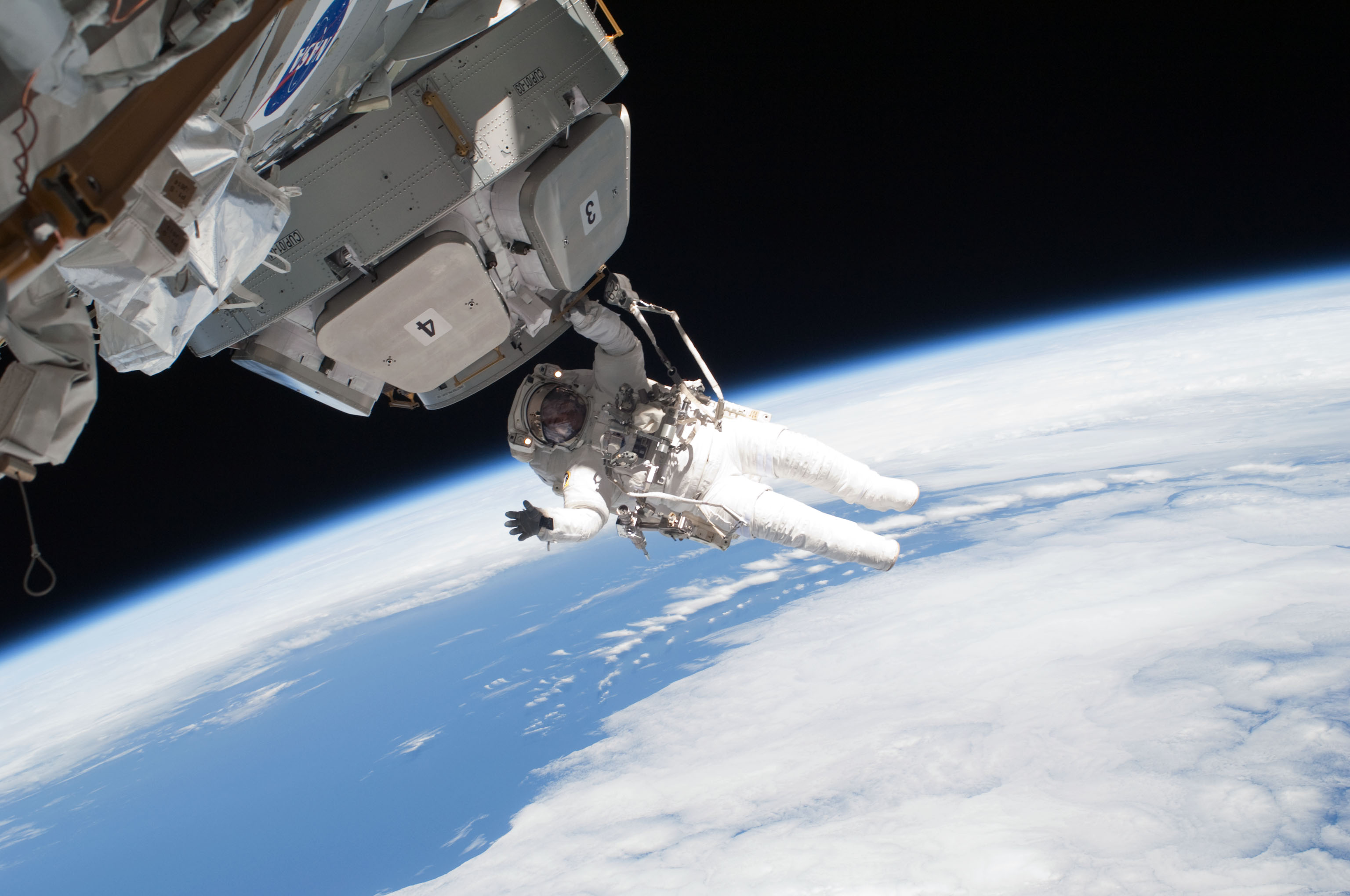
Nick Patrick outside the Cupola during spacewalk 3

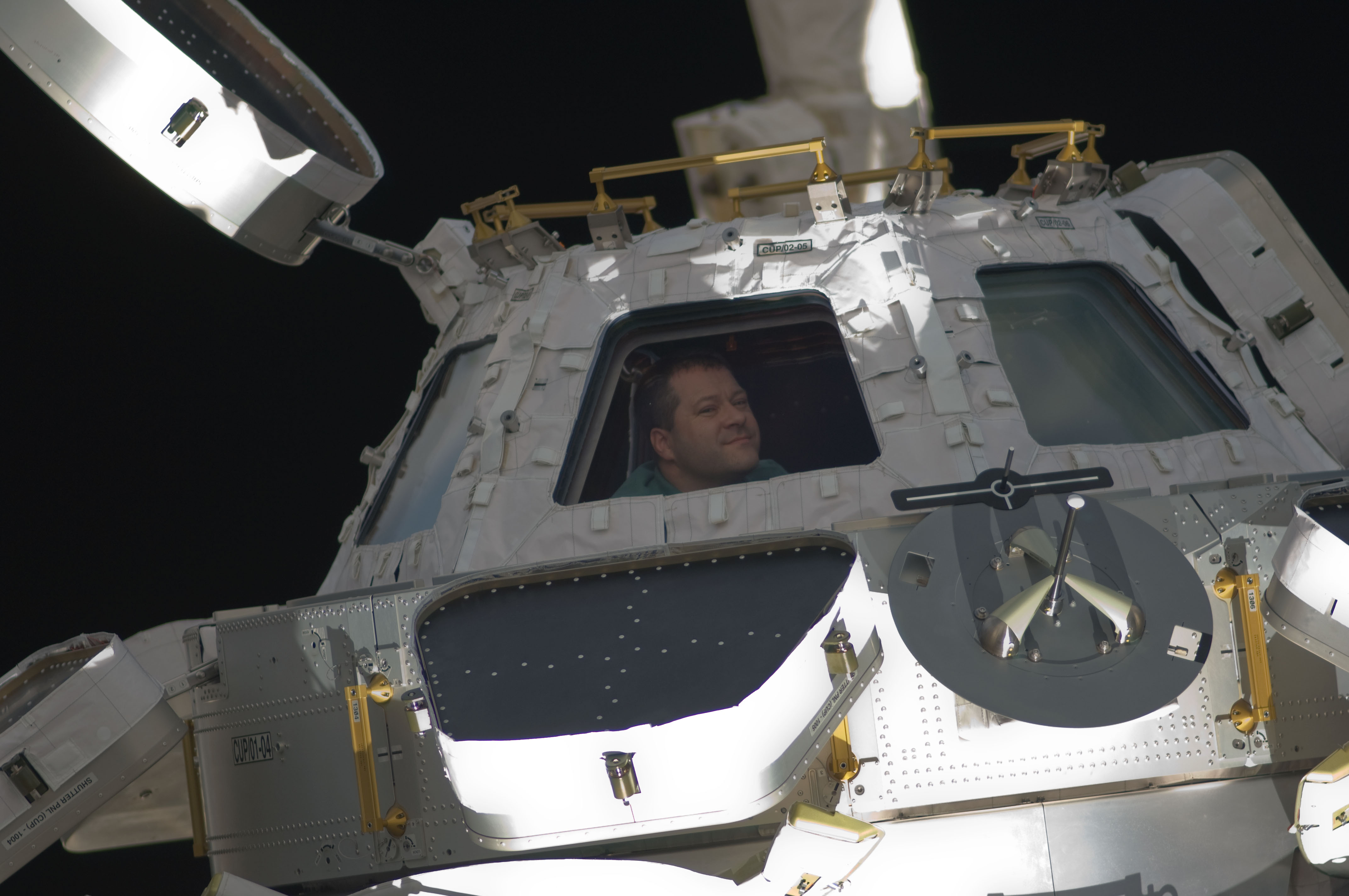
Nick Patrick checking the view from inside.

=== February 18 (Flight Day 11) ===
On flight day 11, the joint Expedition 22/STS-130 crew received a phone call from U.S. President Barack Obama and several school children. After the conference with President Obama and the children, the crew members began transferring Environmental control and life support system (ECLSS) racks to the Tranquility module. These transfers were done by ISS commander Jeff Williams, flight engineer T.J. Creamer, Shuttle commander George Zamka and mission specialist Stephen Robinson and took most of the day. Also during the day pilot Terry Virts continued working on getting the Cupola set-up for the robotics work station. He had a small problem installing some corner panels which are needed to hold the workstation. Spacewalkers Bob Behnken and Nick Patrick were busy reconfiguring the airlock for use by the station crew and later flights. They also transferred their spacesuits and tools back to the shuttle for the return trip home. After the rack transfers were done the crew completed some more transfers and passed the 75% complete mark. The Space Shuttle commanded by commander George Zamka and pilot Terry Virts completed a reboost of the station using its vernier thrusters.

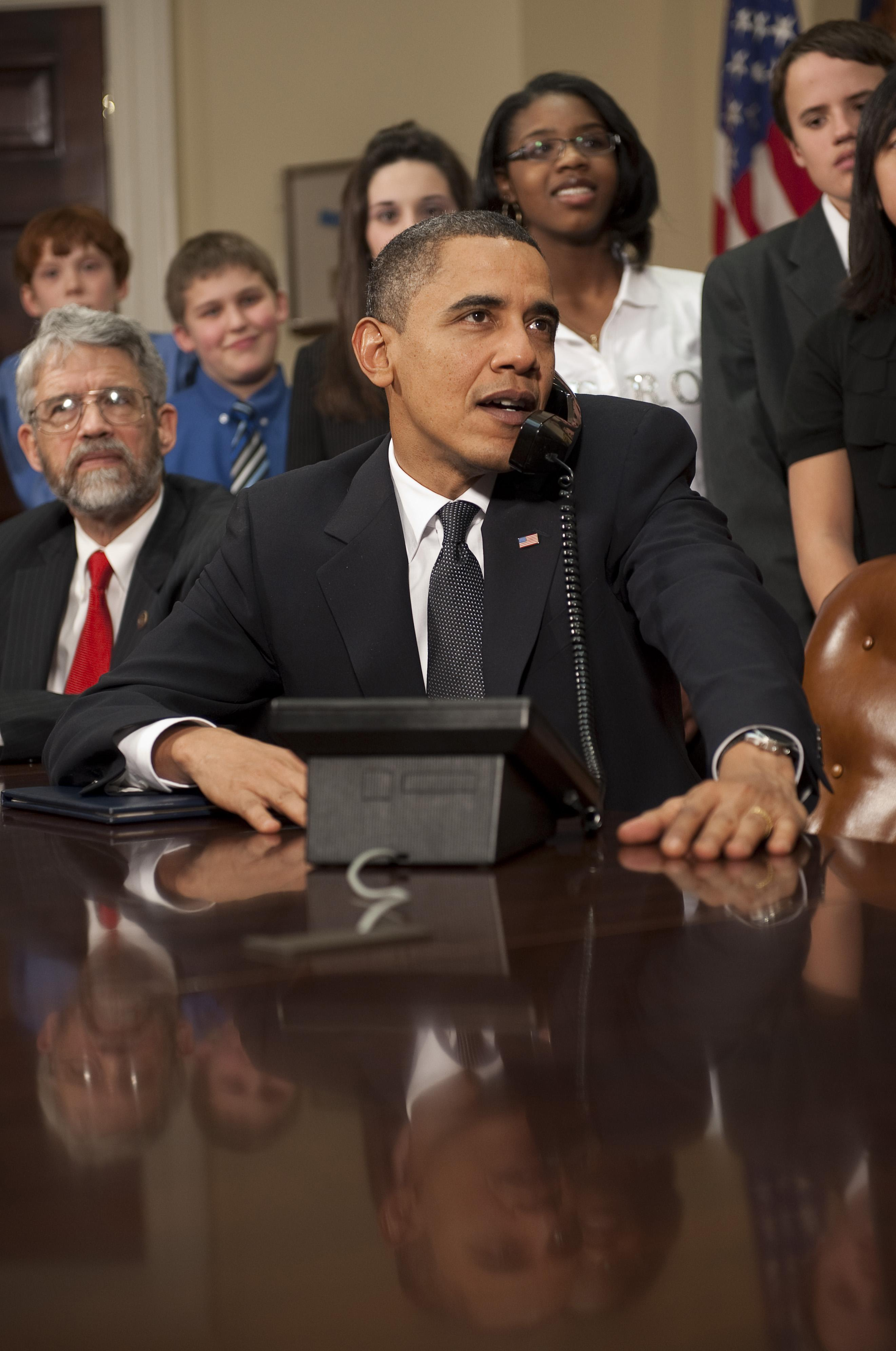
President Obama during a call to the crew on flight day 11.

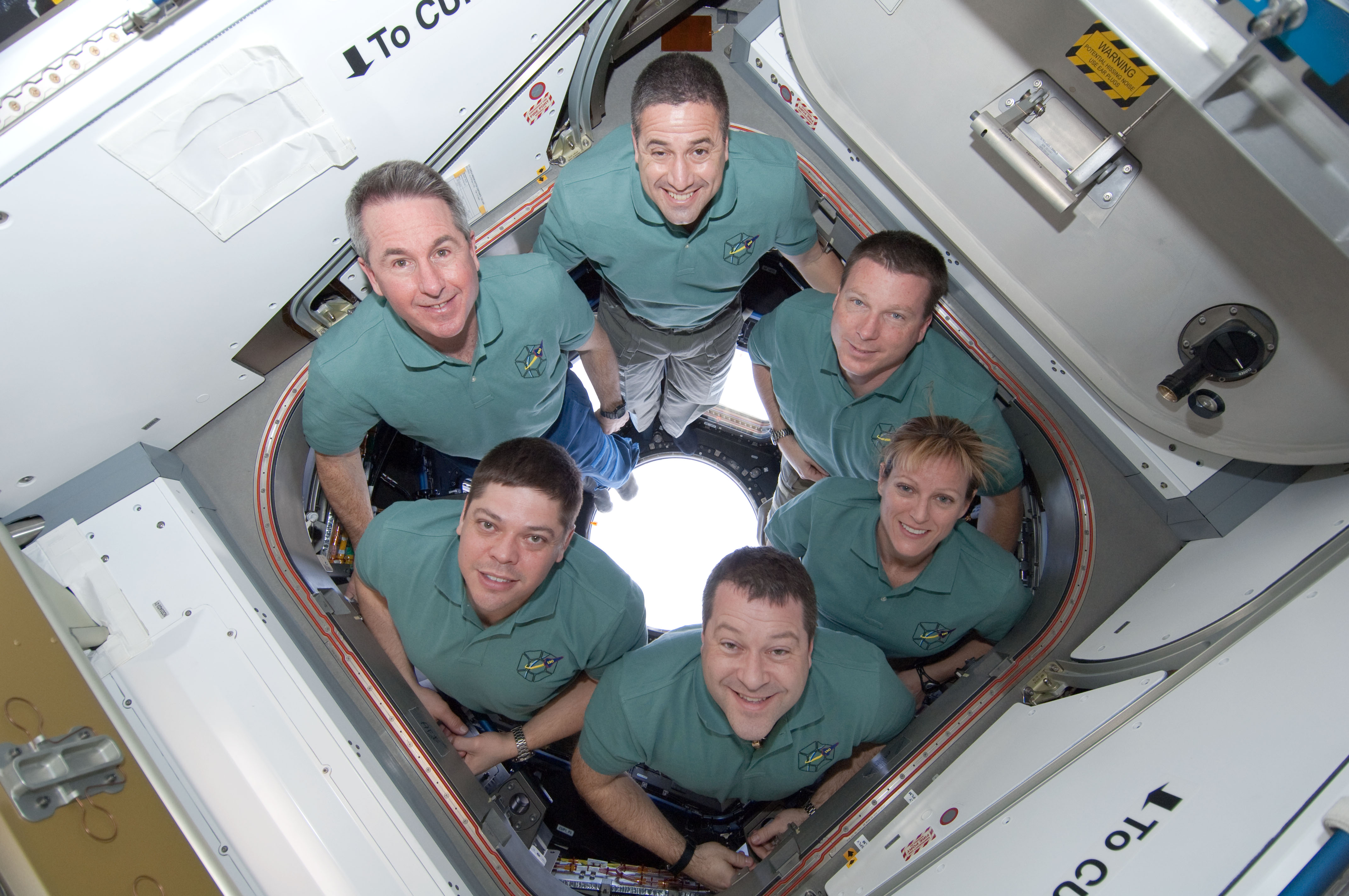
STS 130 crew members pose for a portrait in the Cupola

=== February 19 (Flight Day 12) ===
The STS-130 crew completed their remaining transfer tasks on flight day 12. The joint STS-130/Expedition 22 crew held a joint press conference with reports at NASA centers and in Japan. ISS commander Jeff Williams and shuttle commander George Zamka held a ribbon cutting ceremony to officially open the Cupola for use. After the conference and ribbon cutting ceremony the crews gathered one last time for a meal together in the Unity module. After their meal the crews conducted a farewell ceremony and closed the hatches between the two vehicles. The latter part of the STS-130 crew's day was spent stowing items and getting their rendezvous tools out and checking them out to ensure they are ready for undocking.

=== February 20 (Flight Day 13: Undocking) ===
Space Shuttle Endeavour successfully undocked with the ISS at 00:54 UTC (19:54 EST) on flight day 13. After undocking, pilot Terry Virts backed Endeavour to a distance of 400 feet (120 m) and began conducting a fly around of the ISS. After the fly around was complete, Virts used Endeavour's jets to move the shuttle to a point behind the station. Once the separation burns were complete, the crew conducted the late inspection of the shuttles thermal protection system. The inspection took up most of the crews afternoon with crew members rotating in and out to help with it. Commander George Zamka performed a waste water and condensate water dump, with the help of Terry Virts.

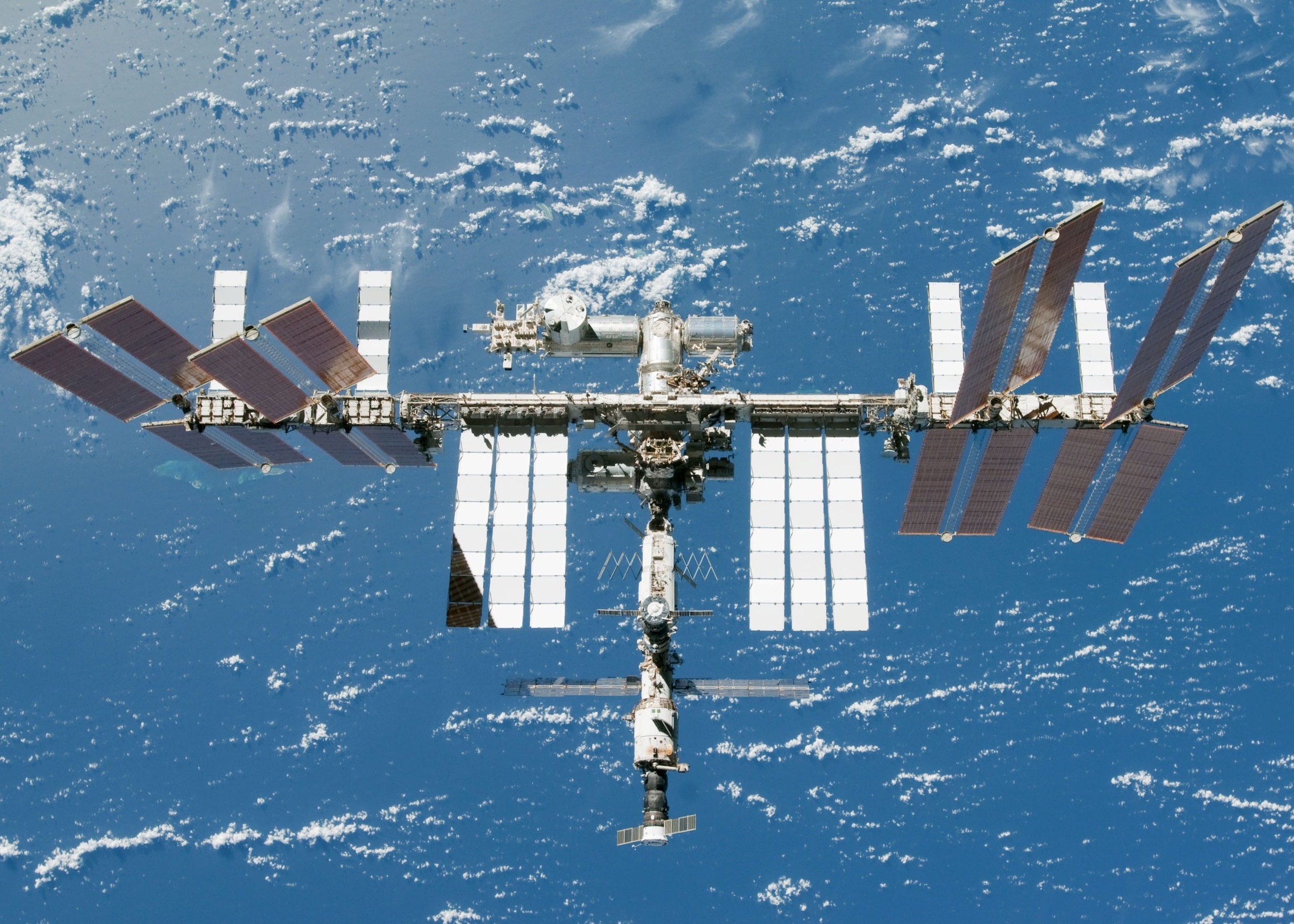
The newly upgraded International Space Station seen from the shuttle after undocking.

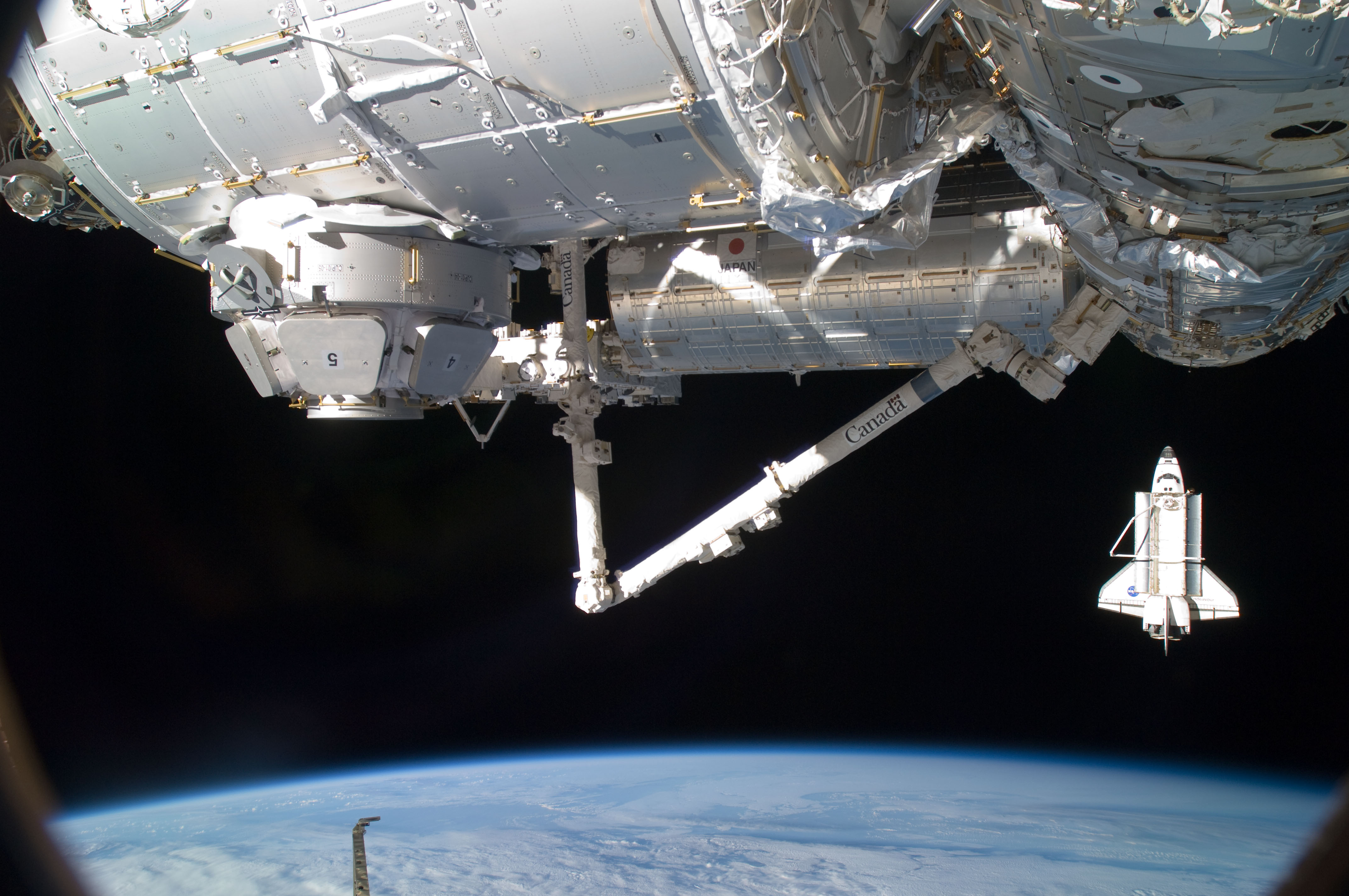
Endeavour seen from the International Space Station after undocking

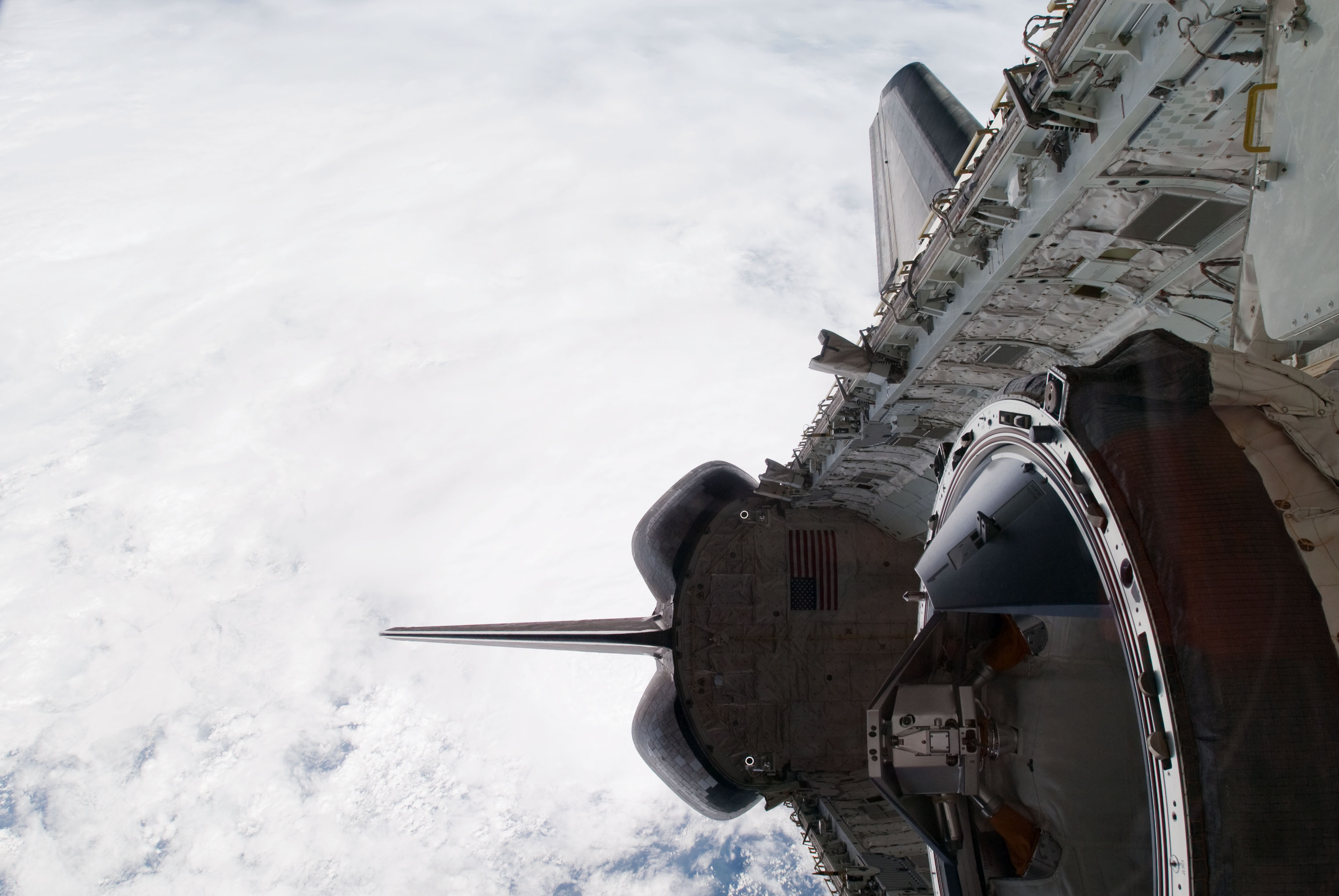
Port side of Endeavour's cargo bay after undocking.

=== February 21 (Flight Day 14: Landing Prep) ===
The crew of STS-130 began preparing the Space Shuttle Endeavour for landing. During the day commander George Zamka and pilot Terry Virts, with help from mission specialist and flight engineer Stephen Robinson checked out the Flight Control System (FCS) and did a hot fire test of the Reaction Control System (RCS). Commander Zamka also did communications checks with mission control through the tracking stations at Merit Island, White Sands Space Harbor and Edwards Air Force Base. These checks are routine for the day before landing and were all successful. While all the system checkouts were going on, the rest of the crew were stowing items no longer needed during the flight. During the early part of the day Stephen Robinson and Terry Virts also stowed and deactivated the Space Shuttle robotic arm. The entire crew also took time out of their day to conduct an in-flight interview with CNN, CNN Español and Univision.

=== February 22 (Flight Day 15: Landing) ===
Landing video (2 mins 57 secs)

Space Shuttle Endeavour and her STS-130 crew awoke on flight day 15 to begin getting ready for landing. The landing preparations included closing the payload bay doors, activating the Auxiliary Power Units and getting into their launch and entry suits. Commander George Zamka and pilot Terry Virts fired Endeavours 2 OMS engines for 2 mins 38 secs, this slowed Endeavour by about 200 ft/s (140 mph). The decision to go ahead with the de-orbit burn was made 25 min prior to the burn occurring. Landing occurred at 22:22:10 EST at the Kennedy Space Center's Shuttle Landing Facility runway 15. The crew exited the orbiter and inspected it about two hours after landing. All six crew members spoke to the press on the runway before heading back to the Operations and Check-out building.

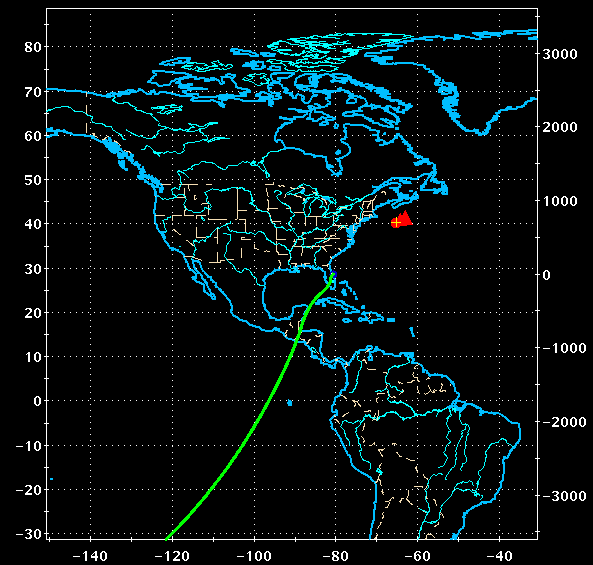
Long range ground track on orbit 217.

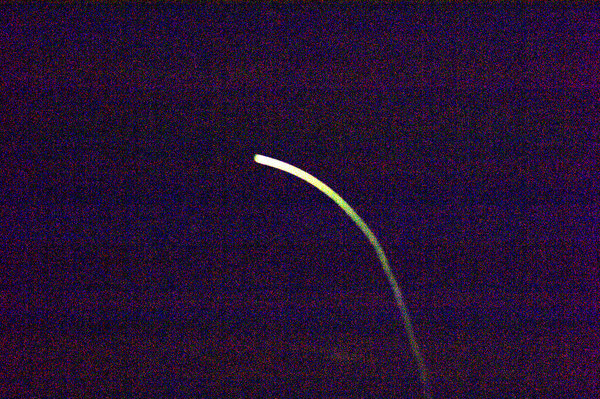
Endeavour making S-turn during atmospheric reentry, photographed by astronaut Soichi Noguchi from inside the Cupola.

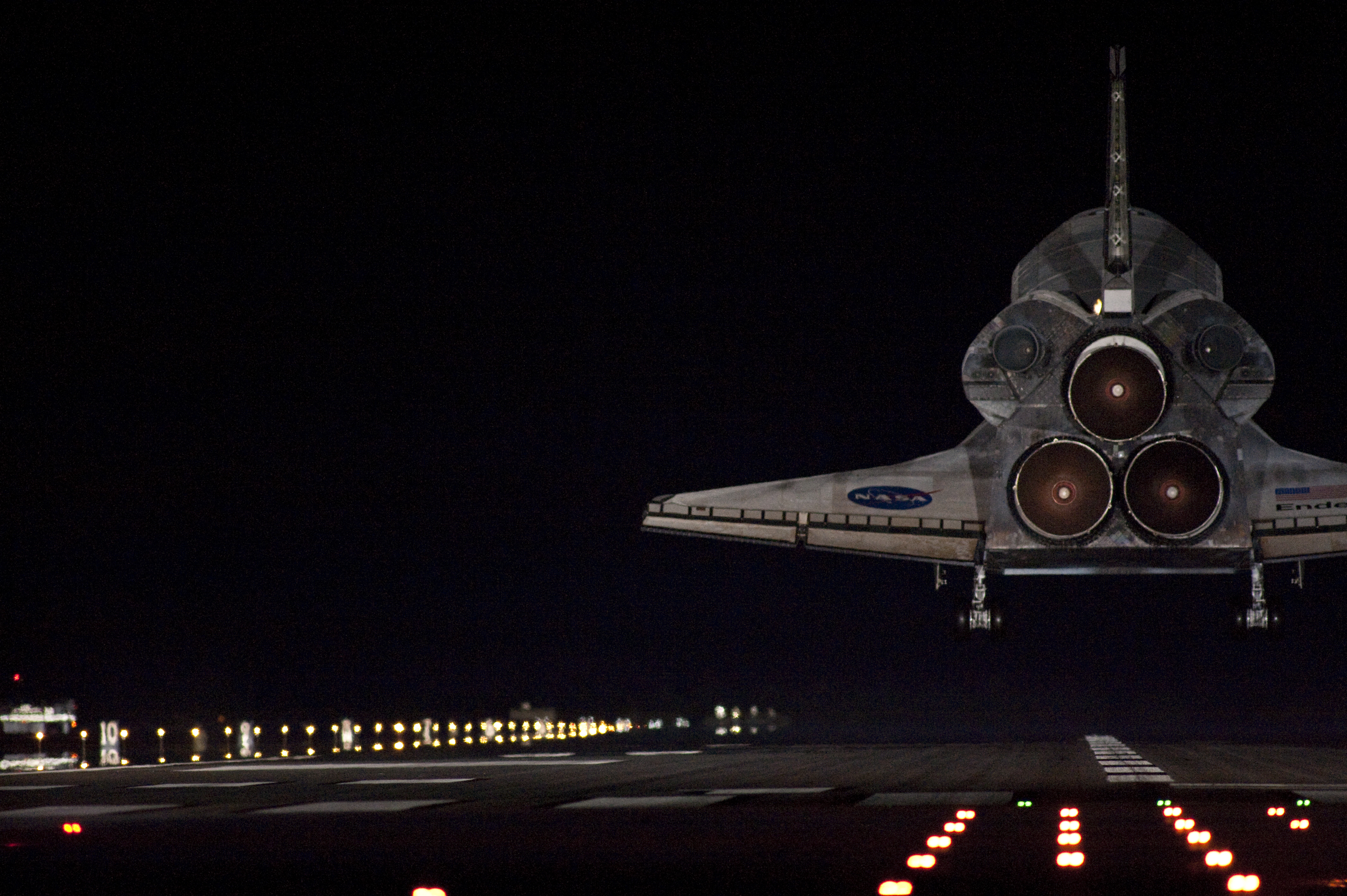
Space Shuttle Endeavour touches down at the Shuttle Landing Facility at Kennedy Space Center, 21 February 2010.

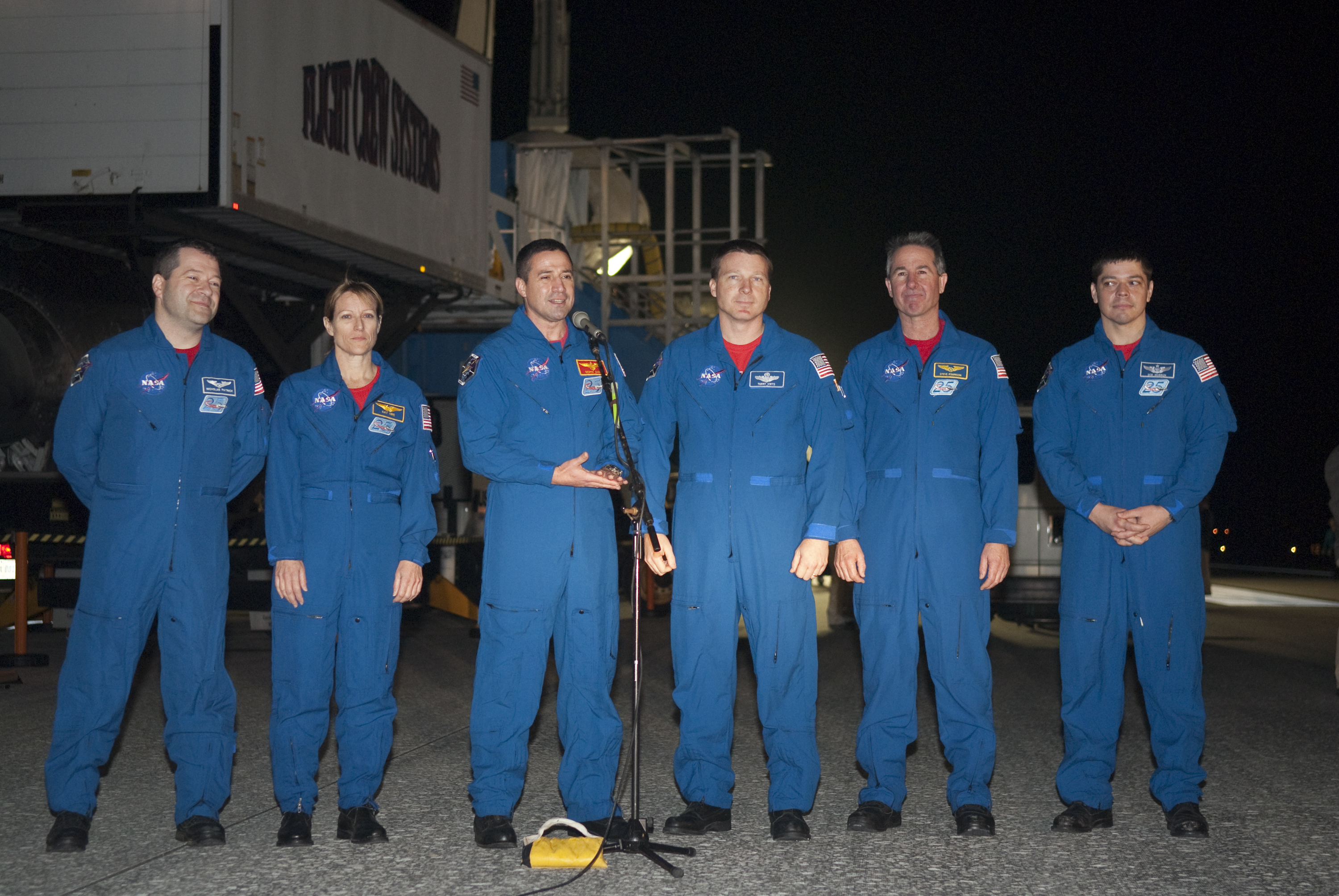
Commander George Zamka comments after landing.

== Spacewalks ==
EVA	Spacewalkers	Start (UTC)	End (UTC)	Duration
EVA 1	Robert L. Behnken; Nicholas Patrick	February 12, 2010; 2:17 UTC	February 12, 2010; 8:49 UTC	6 hours 32 minutes
EVA 1	Behnken and Patrick removed a protective cover on a port on the Unity node where Tranquility will be berthed halfway through the spacewalk. They then moved on to release launch locks and connects on Tranquility that connected it to the shuttle. The pair then removed a spare parts platform from Special Purpose Dexterous Manipulator or Dextre that will be replaced by a new one on a future mission. Once that task was completed Behnken and Patrick then made several connections on the newly installed Tranquility node to bring it to life.			
EVA 2	Robert L. Behnken; Nicholas Patrick	February 14, 2010; 2:20 UTC	February 14, 2010; 8:14 UTC	5 hours 54 minutes
EVA 2	Behnken and Patrick installed ammonia plumbing and connectors between Unity, Destiny, and Tranquility and cover them with thermal insulation. When turned on, the ammonia will provide cooling to Tranquility. They then prepared a port on the Earth-facing side of Tranquility for the flight day 8 relocation and attachment of the Cupola.			
EVA 3	Nicholas Patrick; Robert L. Behnken	February 17, 2010; 2:15 UTC	February 17, 2010; 8:03 UTC	5 hours 48 minutes
EVA 3	Behnken and Patrick turned on the ammonia cooling lines between Unity and Tranquility, installed heater and data cables on Tranquility, removed insulation and launch locks from the newly installed Cupola, and installed handrails on the outside of Tranquility.			

== Wake-up calls ==
NASA began a tradition of playing music to astronauts during the Gemini program, which was first used to wake up a flight crew during Apollo 15. Each track is specially chosen, often by their families, and usually has a special meaning to an individual member of the crew, or is applicable to their daily activities.

Flight Day	Song	Artist	Played for	Links
Day 2	"Give Me Your Eyes"	Brandon Heath	Terry Virts	WAV, MP3; TRANSCRIPT
Day 3	"Katmandu"	Bob Seger	George Zamka	WAV, MP3; TRANSCRIPT
Day 4	"Also sprach Zarathustra"	Richard Strauss	Nicholas Patrick	WAV, MP3; TRANSCRIPT
Day 5	"Beautiful Day"	U2	Kathryn Hire	WAV, MP3; TRANSCRIPT
Day 6	"The Ballad of Serenity" (Opening theme to Firefly)	Sonny Rhodes	Robert Behnken	WAV, MP3; TRANSCRIPT
Day 7	"Too Much Stuff"	Delbert McClinton	Stephen Robinson	WAV, MP3; TRANSCRIPT
Day 8	"Forty Years On (Harrow School song)"	Edward Ernest Bowen & John Farmer	Nicholas Patrick	WAV, MP3; TRANSCRIPT
Day 9	"Parabola"	Tool	Robert Behnken	WAV, MP3; TRANSCRIPT
Day 10	"Window on the World"	Jimmy Buffett	Kathryn Hire	WAV, MP3; TRANSCRIPT
Day 11	"Oh Yeah"	Johnny A.	Stephen Robinson	WAV, MP3; TRANSCRIPT
Day 12	"I'm Gonna Be (500 Miles)"	Steven Curtis Chapman	Terry Virts	WAV, MP3; TRANSCRIPT
Day 13	"In Wonder"	Newsboys	Terry Virts	WAV, MP3; TRANSCRIPT
Day 14	"The Distance"	Cake	The entire crew	WAV, MP3; TRANSCRIPT
Day 15	"The Marines Hymn"	United States Marine Corps Band	George Zamka	WAV, MP3; TRANSCRIPT

== See also ==
- 2010 in spaceflight
- List of human spaceflights
- List of International Space Station spacewalks
- List of Space Shuttle missions
- List of spacewalks 2000–2014
