= Orbiter Boom Sensor System =

Inspection boom

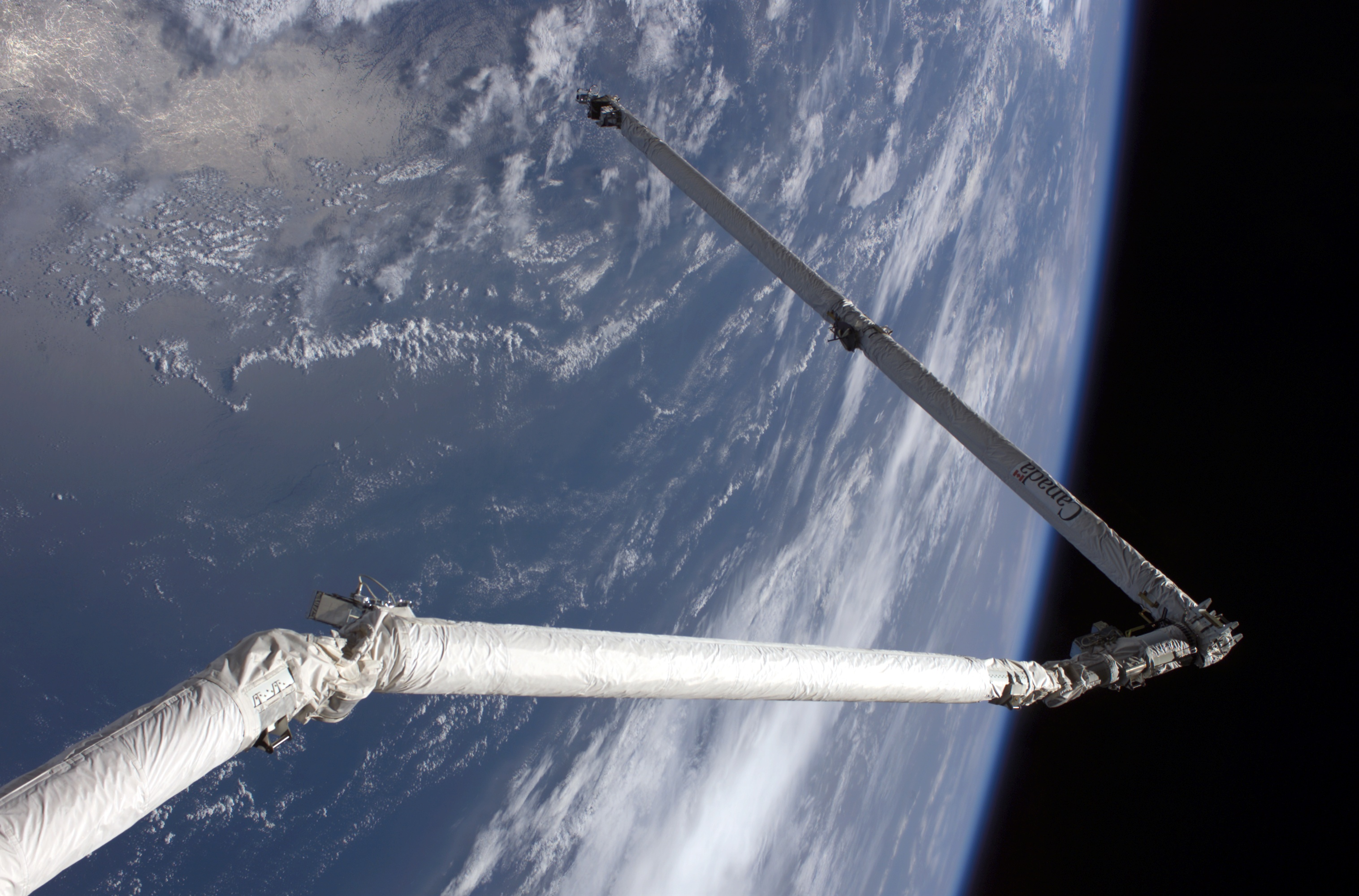
Shuttle Remote Manipulator System (RMS) holding OBSS boom on STS-114

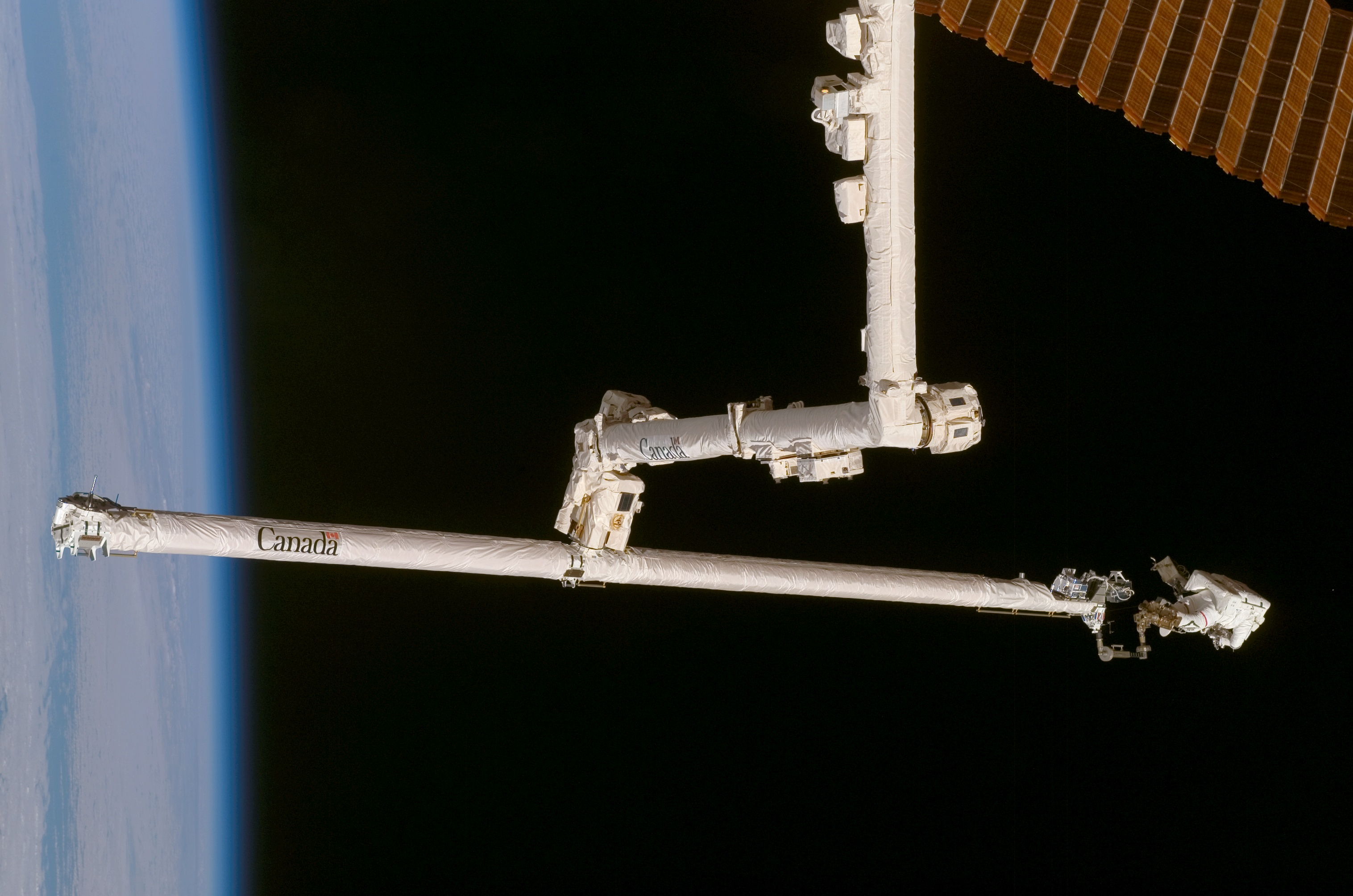
Astronaut Scott Parazynski at the end of the OBSS boom making repairs to the P6 solar array

The Orbiter Boom Sensor System (OBSS) was a 50-foot (15.24 m) boom carried on board NASA's Space Shuttles. The boom was grappled by the Canadarm and served as an extension of the arm, doubling its length to a combined total of 100 feet (30 m). At the far end of the boom was an instrumentation package of cameras and lasers used to scan the leading edges of the wings, the nose cap, and the crew compartment after each lift-off and before each landing. If flight engineers suspected potential damage to other areas, as evidenced in imagery captured during lift-off or the rendezvous pitch maneuver, then additional regions could be scanned.

The OBSS was introduced to the shuttle fleet with STS-114, the "Return to Flight" mission executed by Discovery, and was flown on every mission after that until the retirement of the Space Shuttle fleet in 2011. It was used to inspect the shuttle for damage to the heat shield, officially called the Thermal Protection System (TPS), that could jeopardize the shuttle during re-entry. The decision to perform focused inspections of the TPS was prompted by the Space Shuttle Columbia disaster, in which Columbia was destroyed due to damage inflicted to its TPS during launch. The OBSS was central to focused inspections of the TPS, not only because it carried all the instruments necessary for detailed measurements and observations, but also because without it, the Canadarm was too short to reach to all the areas that needed to be surveyed.

== Description ==
The boom was essentially the same design as the Canadarm itself, except that the articulatory joints are fixed. OBSS arms for the three remaining orbiters were manufactured relatively quickly, primarily because some spare parts for the Canadarm system were used.

Two instrumentation packages are installed at the far end of the OBSS. Sensor package 1 consists of the Laser Dynamic Range Imager (LDRI) and an Intensified Television Camera (ITVC). Sensor package 2 is the Laser Camera System (LCS) and a digital camera (IDC). The sensors can record at a resolution of a few millimeters, and can scan at a rate of about 2.5 inches (64 mm) per second.

It is also fitted with handrails, so that the boom could be used to provide spacewalkers with access to the shuttle's underbelly in case in-flight repairs were required.

== STS-120 ISS repair ==
During STS-120 the OBSS was used as an extension boom for the space station's Canadarm2, something it was never designed to do. During this mission the P6 solar array had become damaged during the redeploy. Canadarm2 grabbed the arm on its center Flight-Releasable Grapple Fixture and then astronaut Scott E. Parazynski was mounted at the end of the boom to make the repair. Because Canadarm2 was unable to power the OBSS, it was without power many hours more than it was designed to handle, but because it was heated up considerably before the start of the repair it stayed undamaged.

== Enhanced ISS boom assembly ==
Due to the benefits for spacewalkers from the extended range provided by connecting an OBSS to the International Space Station (ISS)'s robotic arm, NASA implemented a plan for STS-134 to leave its OBSS behind on the ISS, where it would permanently remain. The plan resulted in a number of modifications to the OBSS, now known as the Enhanced ISS Boom Assembly, including the addition of a Power Data and Grapple Fixture which enables mating to the robotic arm on the end of the boom with a Canadarm2-compatible grapple fixture to favor station use. The boom was stowed on the ISS S1 Integrated Truss Structure on the fourth spacewalk of STS-134 on May 27, 2011. The OBSS sensors were disconnected during the EVA, and are not designed to withstand thermal conditions outside the ISS without power to keep them warm. However, the modification of the grapple fixture could enable such equipment to be mounted onto the OBSS in the future.
