= Dextre =

Robotic arm on ISS

Special Purpose Dexterous Manipulator
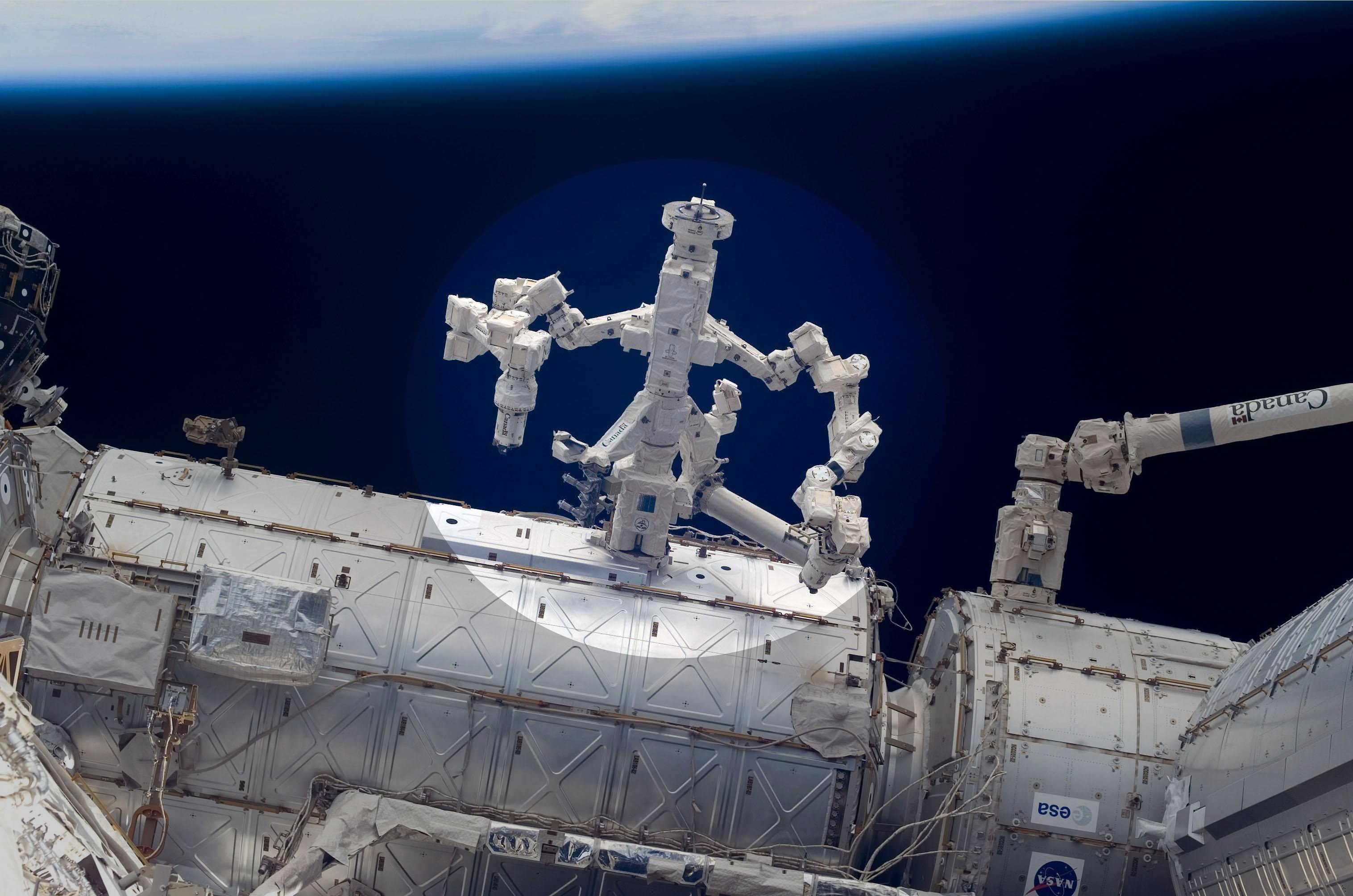
- Dextre, many of the ISS's Robotic arms and experiments, can be operated from Earth, performing tasks while the crew sleeps.
- Operator: NASA
- Manufacturer: MDA
- Instrument type: telemanipulator
- Website: www.asc-csa.gc.ca/eng/iss/dextre/

Properties
- Mass: 1,662 kg (3,664 lb)
- Dimensions: 3.5 m (11 ft)
- Number launched: 1

Host spacecraft
- Spacecraft: International Space Station
- Operator: USOS: NASA; Columbus: ESA; Kibō: JAXA; ROS: Roscosmos
- Launch date: March 11, 2008; 18 years ago
- Rocket: Space Shuttle
- Launch site: Kennedy LC-39A

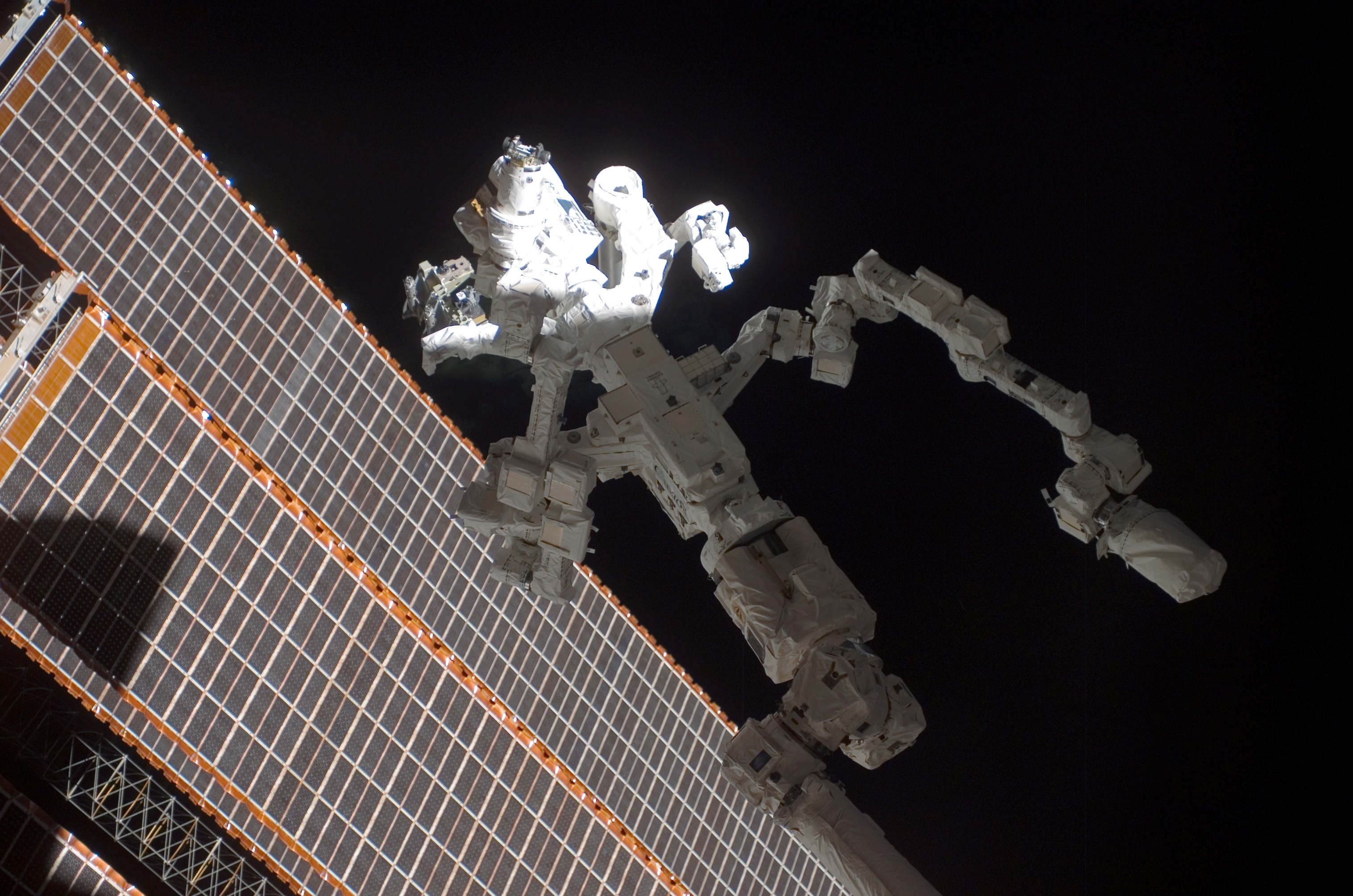
Dextre on the end of Canadarm2

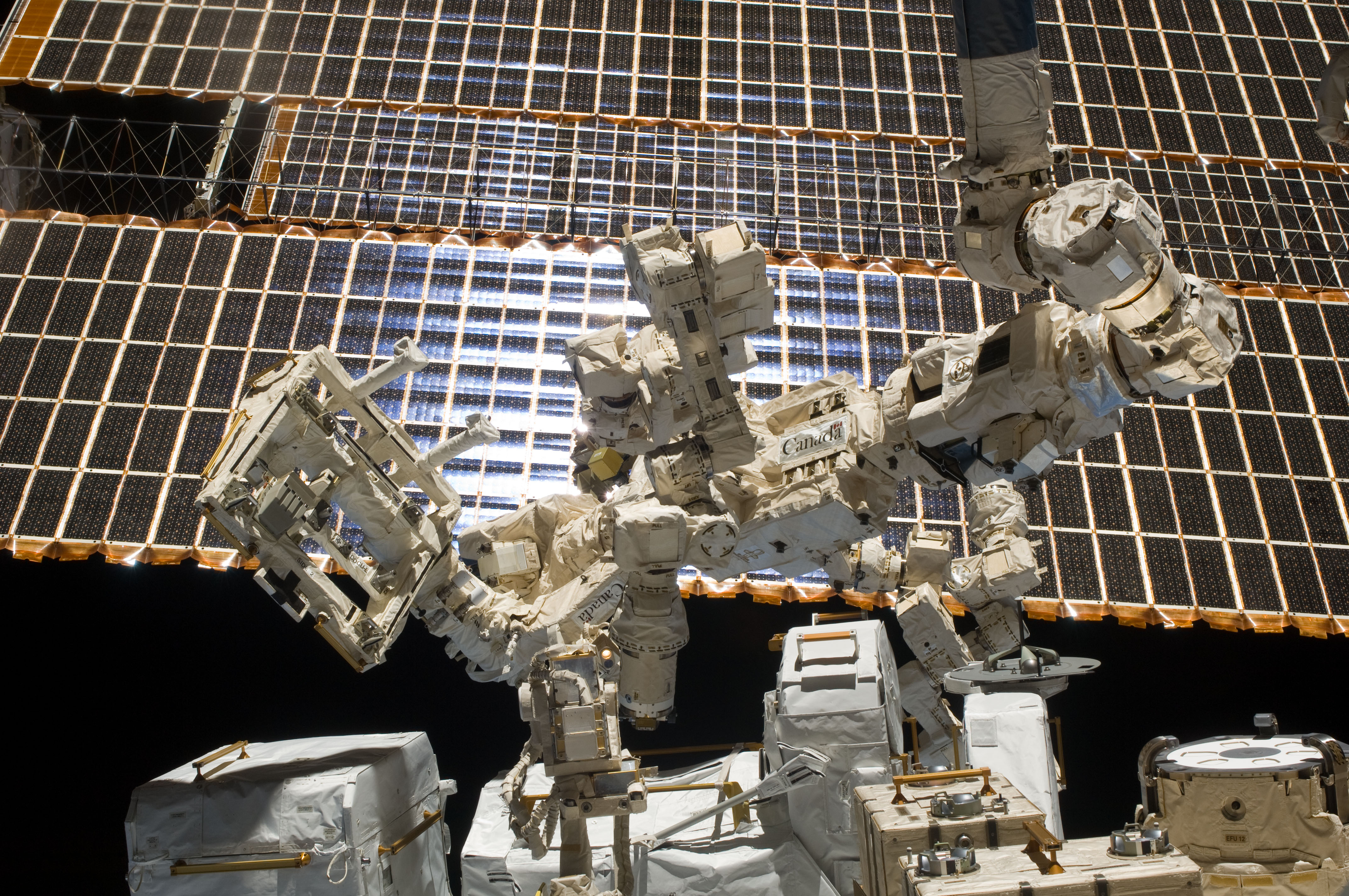
Dextre, as photographed by an Expedition 26 crew member

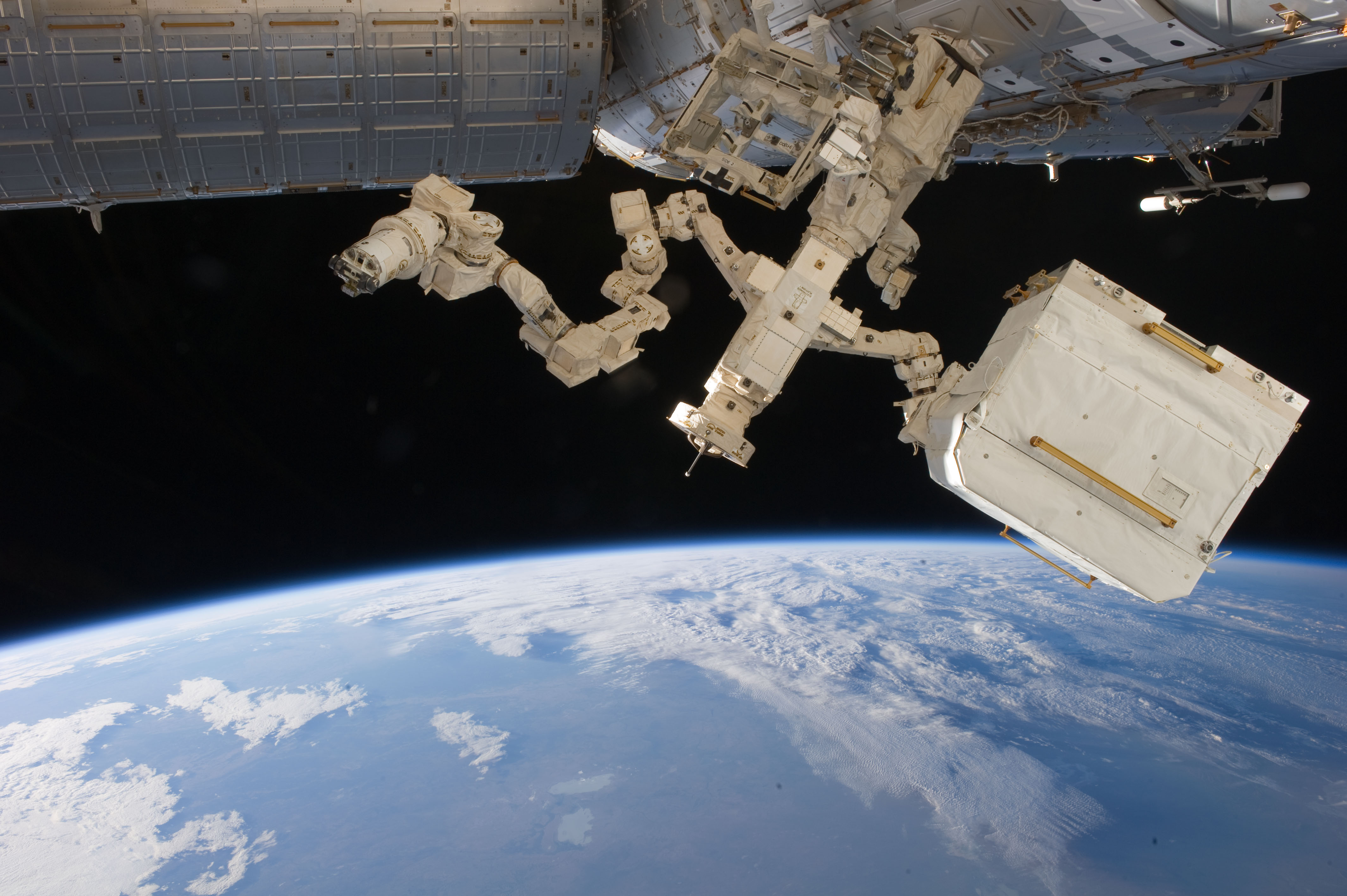
Dextre, as photographed by an Expedition 27 crew member

Dextre, also known as the Special Purpose Dexterous Manipulator (SPDM), is a two-armed robot, or telemanipulator, which is part of the Mobile Servicing System on the International Space Station (ISS), and does repairs that would otherwise require astronauts to do spacewalks. It was launched on March 11, 2008, on the mission STS-123.

Dextre is a part of Canada's contributions to the ISS and was named to represent its dexterous nature. Dextre is the newest of three Canadian robotic arms used on the ISS, preceded by the Space Shuttle's Canadarm and the large Canadarm2. Dextre was designed and manufactured by MDA.

In the early morning of February 4, 2011, Dextre completed its first official assignment which consisted of unpacking two pieces for Kounotori 2 while the on-board crew was sleeping.

== Purpose ==
Dextre is designed to handle and complete orbital replacement units: Many spares are stored on the ISS and Dextre is able to carry them to and from worksites and install replacements when failures occur. Before Dextre arrived astronauts were required to perform space walks to carry out this long work.

== Structure ==
Dextre resembles a gigantic torso fitted with two extremely agile, 3.5 metres (11 ft) arms. The total mass is about 1,662 kilograms (3,664 lb). The 3.5-metre-long body pivots at the "waist". The body has a Power Data grapple fixture at the 'head' end that can be grasped by the larger Space Station Arm, Canadarm2 so that Dextre can be positioned at the various Orbital Replacement Unit (ORU) worksites around the Space Station. The other end of the body has a Latching End Effector virtually identical to that of Canadarm2, so that Dextre can also be attached to Space Station grapple fixtures or the Mobile Base System.

Dextre can also be operated whilst it is attached to the end of Canadarm2.

Each arm is somewhat like a shortened Canadarm2 (in that it has 7 joints) but is fixed to Dextre at one end.

At the end of Dextre's arms are ORU/Tool Changeout Mechanisms (OTCM). The OTCM has built-in grasping jaws, a retractable socket drive, a monochrome TV camera, lights, and an umbilical connector that can provide power, data, and video to/from a payload.

Dextre moves one arm at a time, while one arm may hold onto the station (using specially provided standard H or Micro interfaces) for stability and ease of control the other is available to perform tasks.

== Tools ==
The lower body of Dextre has a pair of orientable colour TV cameras with lights, a platform for stowing ORUs, and a tool holster. The tool holster is equipped with two Robotic Micro Conical Tools (RMCTs), which allow an arm to grasp additional types of ORU fixtures. The Socket Extension Tool (SET) extends the length of the grasping socket on an arm, and the Robotic Off-Set Tool (ROST) allows an arm to grasp difficult-to-reach targets.

Several new tools were added as part of the 2011 Robotic Refueling Mission. A Wire Cutter, Safety Cap Removal Tool, EVR Nozzle Tool and a Multifunction Tool with several adapters. These tools are not installed on Dextre but are used by Dextre when performing RRM operations. The tools are not considered a part of Dextre's complement of tools and are stowed on the RRM platform.

In 2013 the H-II Transport Vehicle brought the RRM On-orbit Transfer Cage (ROTC), which is a sliding table within the Japanese airlock platform from which to retrieve and subsequently install new hardware.

The Visual Inspection Poseable Invertebrate Robot (VIPIR), a borescope camera with a 34-inch long flexible tube, was added as part of the Robotic Refueling Mission — Phase 2. It was delivered to the station in 2014.

In 2015, the International Space Station Robotic External Leak Locator (IRELL), developed by NASA, was delivered to the ISS. It includes a mass spectrometer and an ion vacuum pressure gauge to detect leaks of ammonia, one of the coolants used on the International Space Station.

=== Future possibilities ===
SARAH (Self-Adaptive Robotic Auxiliary Hand) is a three-fingered hand that is designed to attach to the end of Dextre's arm. It has not been delivered to the ISS.

== Design and delivery ==
Dextre was designed and manufactured by MDA Space Missions (now MDA) as part of the $200 million contracted by the Canadian Space Agency, which will oversee its future operations and the necessary training of station crews.

It completed all necessary testing and was delivered to the Kennedy Space Center (KSC) in Florida, in mid-June 2007. Once at KSC, it underwent flight verification testing followed by shuttle integration.

== Installation ==
Dextre was launched to the ISS on March 11, 2008, aboard Space Shuttle Endeavour on mission STS-123. It "woke up" and activated heaters needed for keeping its joints and electronics warm after receiving power from the space station's Canadarm2 on March 14. During the mission's second spacewalk on March 16, spacewalking astronauts attached the two 3.35-metre (11.0 ft) arms to the robot's main body and further prepared the machine for its handyman job on the station. After the spacewalk, crew members hooked Dextre back up to the station's robotic arm to keep it warm and to allow NASA to perform tests to ensure all of Dextre's electronics were working properly. Later that day, the crew tested all of its joints and brakes. Astronauts finished outfitting the robot during a third spacewalk on March 17, 2008.

== Operational use ==
After testing and trials, the first planned use was in the removal and replacement of an RPCM (Remote Power Control Module) in 2009.

In the early morning of February 4, 2011, Dextre completed its first official assignment which consisted of unpacking two pieces for Kounotori 2 while the on-board crew was sleeping.

As flight controllers have gained experience planning and executing Dextre operations, its use has become a more critical part of ISS maintenance. It is capable of removing and replacing (R&R) many ORUs on the ISS that would normally otherwise require costly and risky spacewalks to repair. Examples of items successfully R&R'd include RPCMs, an external camera, a Pump Flow Control Subassembly, and a Main Bus Switching Unit. It is also relied on heavily for extracting experiments and payloads from visiting vehicles, installing them to their final locations on the exterior of the ISS. Finally, Dextre supports scientific research and robotics development through experiments such as the Robotics External Leak Locator, Robotic Refueling Mission, and the Materials International Space Station Experiment Flight Facility (MISSE-FF).

== Other mentions ==
In early August 2004 NASA declared its intention to use Dextre (or a close copy of it) as the robotic component for the Hubble Space Telescope rescue mission. Months after awarding a contract to MDA to provide an SPDM copy for the Hubble repair mission, NASA then canceled the mission in favour of flying a Shuttle mission to perform the repairs/upgrades. NASA cited excessive risks and new-found confidence in the Space Shuttle external tank as reasons for the cancellation.

Dextre was the subject of an April Fool's Day joke article on April 1, 2008, on NASA's APOD website.

Dextre was also featured in the new $5 Canadian Polymer bank note together with Canadarm2, which Commander Chris Hadfield helped reveal aboard the International Space Station.

== See also ==
- Canadarm, which was used on the Space Shuttle
- Mobile Servicing System (MSS), also known by its primary component the Canadarm2, used on the ISS
- European Robotic Arm, A fourth robotic arm attached to the ROS, similar to the Mobile Servicing System
- The Japanese Remote Manipulator System, used on the ISS JEM module Kibō
- Strela, a manually operated crane used on the ROS which performs similar tasks as the Mobile Servicing System
