= Strela (crane) =

Robotic arm installed on the ISS

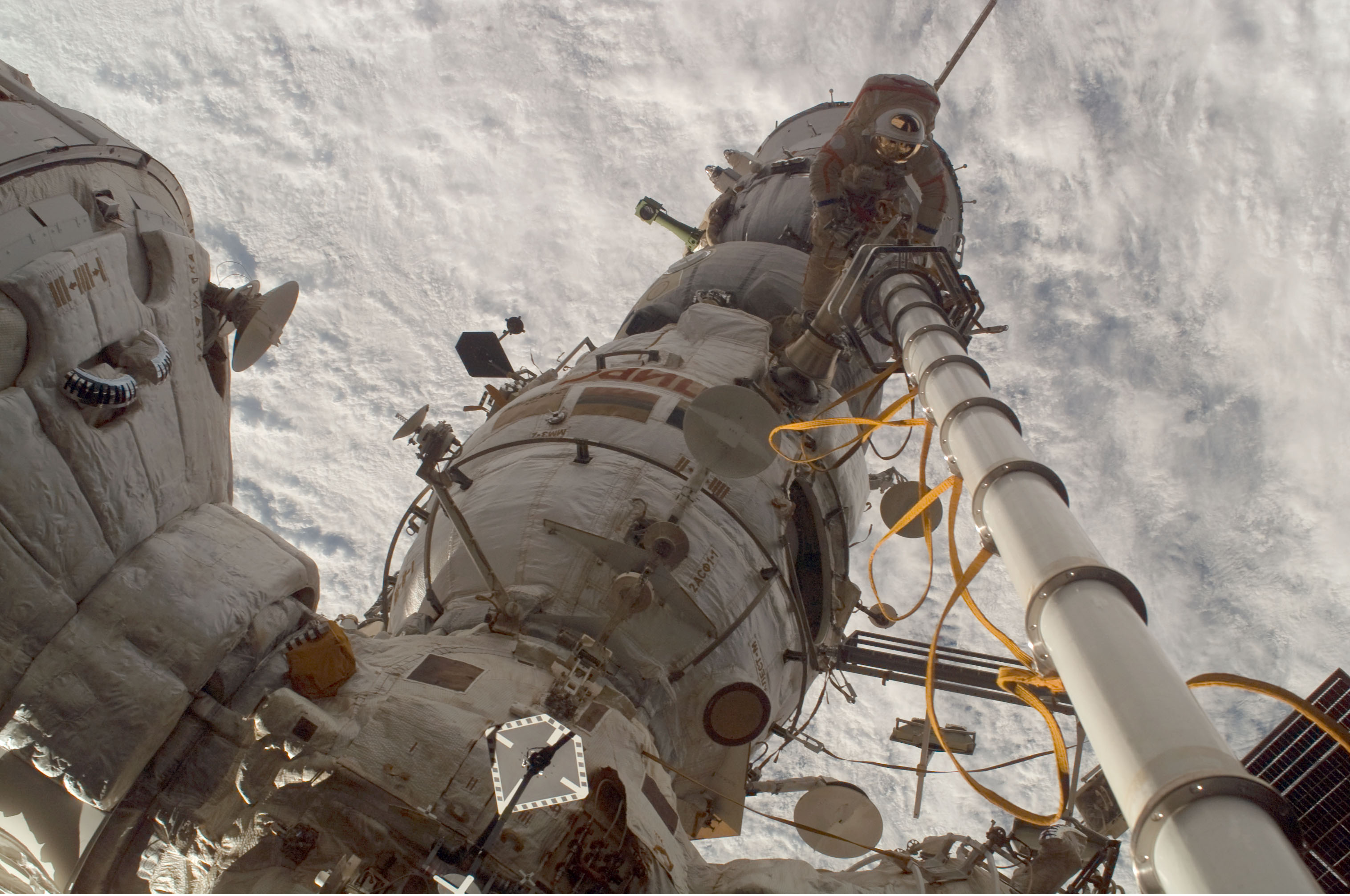
Flight Engineer Kononenko photographs commander Volkov operating the manual Strela crane holding him. The commander stands on Pirs and has his back to the Soyuz spacecraft. Zarya is seen to the left and Zvezda across the bottom of the image.

Strela (Russian: Стрела, lit. 'crane arm') is a class of four Russian-built cargo cranes used during EVAs to move cosmonauts and components around the exterior of the Soviet/Russian space station Mir and the Russian Orbital Segment of the International Space Station.

== Overview ==
Mir featured two cranes mounted to its core module (delivered by Progress spacecraft), and the ISS also possesses two cranes, mounted to Poisk and Zarya. The cranes are unpowered telescopic poles assembled in sections, which measure around 6 feet (182 cm) when collapsed but, when extended using a hand crank, measure 46 feet (14 m) long. This means that the cranes on Mir could easily reach all of the main modules of the complex, and those attached to the ISS can be used to transfer objects the full length of the Russian Orbital Segment (ROS), from Zvezda to Zarya.

The largest robotic arm on the ISS, Canadarm2 weighs 1,800 kilograms and is used to hold crew members during EVAs, move station modules, spacecraft, orbital replacement units and Dextre on the US Orbital Segment. The ROS does not require spacecraft or modules to be manipulated, as all spacecraft and modules dock automatically, and may be repositioned or discarded the same way. Each Strela crane weighs 45 kg and can perform all necessary tasks, with substantial weight savings, less complexity and less maintenance than the Canadarm2 and the European Robotic Arm.

Two Strela cranes were originally carried to the ISS on Integrated Cargo Carriers, the first on STS-96, the second on STS-101, and one was subsequently transferred from Pirs by Expedition 65 before Pirs was decommissioned. An EVA in February, 2012 relocated one Strela crane to the docking compartment Poisk. A second EVA, performed in August, moved the second Strela to Zarya. These moves were required because Pirs was detached and deorbited to allow the MLM Nauka to dock to the location occupied by Pirs.

== See also ==
- Canadarm, which was used on the Space Shuttle
- Dextre, also known as the Special Purpose Dexterous Manipulator (SPDM)
- European Robotic Arm, a robotic arm installed on the ISS Russian Orbital Segment in 2021
- Kibo (ISS module) § Remote manipulator system
- Mobile Servicing System (MSS), also known by its primary component the Canadarm2
