= Canadarm =

Robotic arm used on Space Shuttles

Shuttle Remote Manipulator System
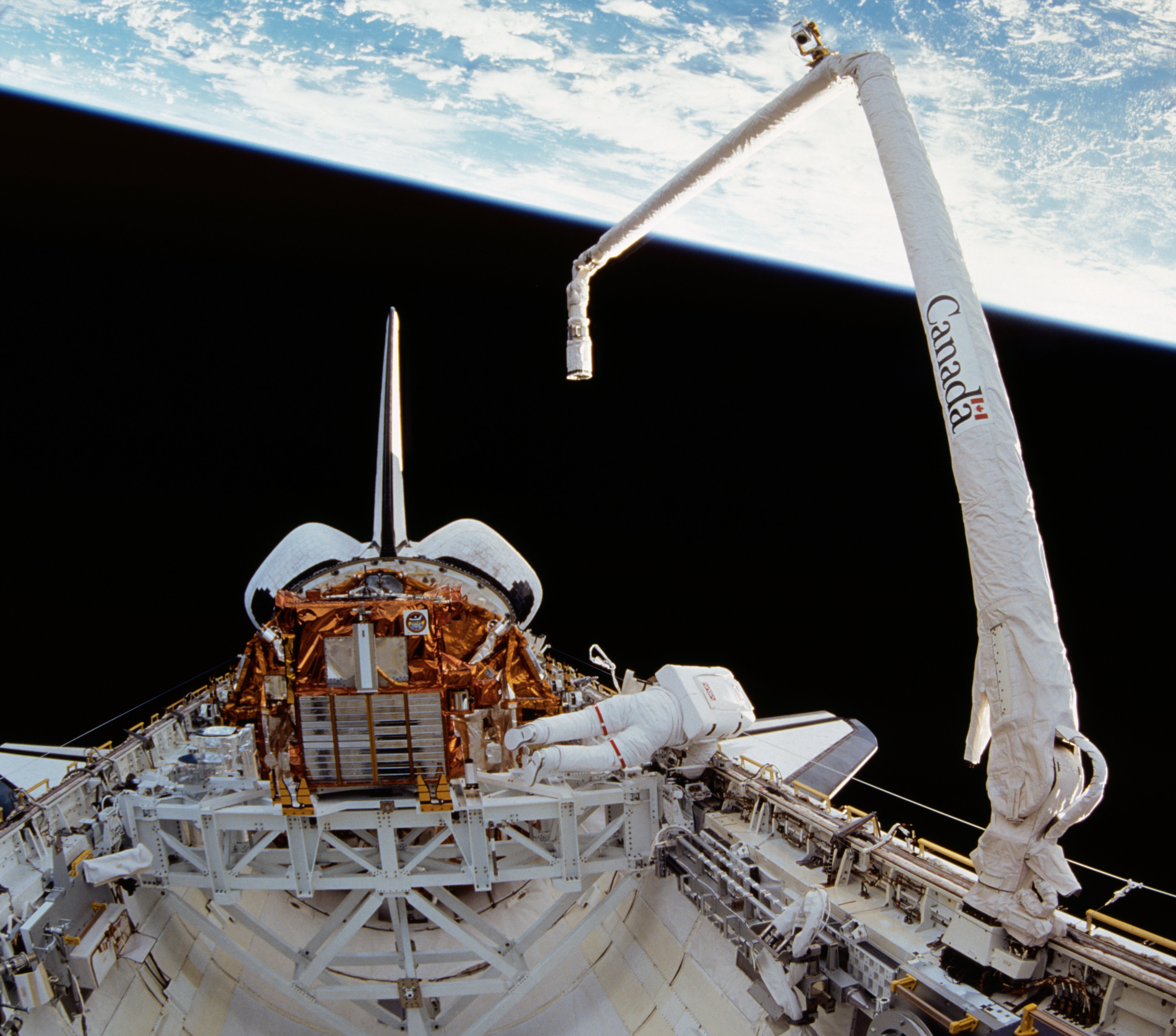
- Canadarm (right) during Space Shuttle mission STS-72
- Operator: NASA; CSA
- Manufacturer: Spar Aerospace
- Instrument type: robotic arm
- Website: www.asc-csa.gc.ca/eng/canadarm/default.asp

Properties
- Mass: Arm: 410 kg (900 lb); Total: 450 kg (990 lb)
- Dimensions: 1,520 cm × 38 cm (598 in × 15 in)
- Number launched: 5

Host spacecraft
- Spacecraft: Space Shuttle
- Operator: NASA
- Launch site: Kennedy LC-39

Canadarm or Canadarm1 (officially Shuttle Remote Manipulator System or SRMS, also SSRMS) is a series of robotic arms that were used on the Space Shuttle orbiters to deploy, maneuver, and capture payloads. After the Space Shuttle Columbia disaster, the Canadarm was always paired with the Orbiter Boom Sensor System (OBSS), which was used to inspect the exterior of the shuttle for damage to the thermal protection system.

== Development ==
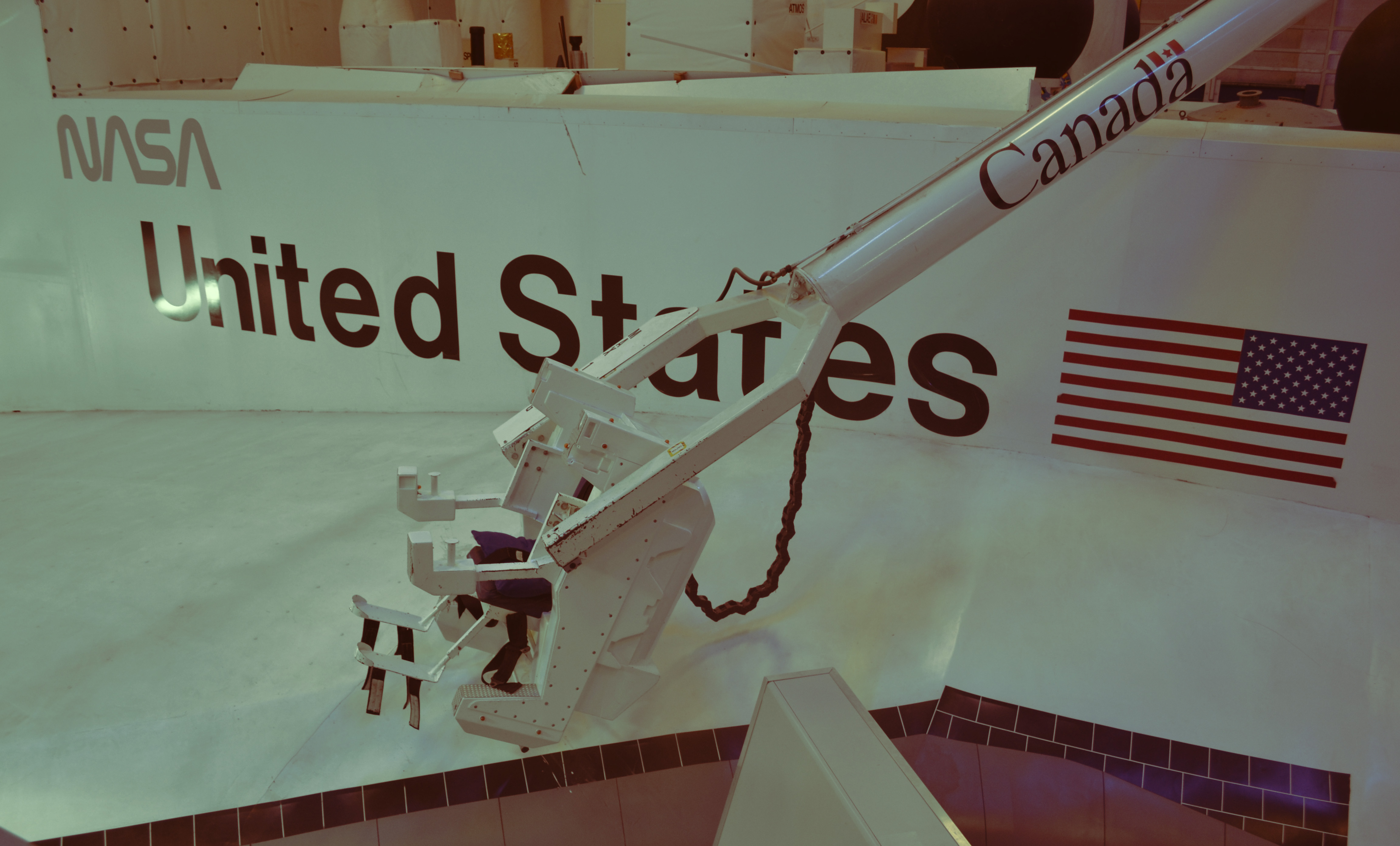
Life-size replica of the Canadarm at the Euro Space Center in Belgium

In 1969, Canada was invited by the National Aeronautics and Space Administration (NASA) to participate in the Space Shuttle program. At the time what that participation would entail had not yet been decided but a manipulator system was identified as an important component. Canadian company DSMA ATCON had developed a robot to load fuel into CANDU nuclear reactors; this robot attracted NASA's attention. In 1975, NASA and the Canadian National Research Council (NRC) signed a memorandum of understanding that Canada would develop and construct the Canadarm.

NRC awarded the manipulator contract to Spar Aerospace (now MDA). Three systems were constructed within this design, development, test, and evaluation contract: an engineering model to assist in the design and testing of the Canadarm, a qualification model that was subjected to environmental testing to qualify the design for use in space, and a flight unit.

=== End effector ===
Anthony "Tony" Zubrzycki, a design engineer at DSMA ATCON, while seconded to SPAR, originated the concept for the Canadarm End Effector, inspired by an elastic band around his fingers. Zubrzycki formally presented this concept to NASA officials. Frank Mee, head of the SPAR mechanical development laboratory, built the end effector prototype based on Tony's concept and is credited by SPAR as the inventor of the Canadarm End Effector. The three-wire crossover design won over the claw-like mechanisms and others, such as the camera iris model, that were being considered.

=== Controls and software ===
The main control algorithms were developed by SPAR and by subcontractor Dynacon Inc. of Toronto. CAE Electronics Ltd. in Montreal provided the display and control panel and the hand controllers located in the Shuttle aft flight deck. Other electronic interfaces, servo amplifiers, and power conditioners located on the Canadarm were designed and built by SPAR at its Montreal factory. The graphite composite boom that provides the structural connection between the shoulder and the elbow joint and the similar boom that connects the elbow to the wrist were produced by General Dynamics in the United States. Dilworth, Secord, Meagher and Associates, Ltd. in Toronto was contracted to produce the engineering model end effector then SPAR evolved the design and produced the qualification and flight units. The Space Shuttle flight software that monitors and controls the Canadarm was developed in Houston, Texas, by the Federal Systems Division of IBM. Rockwell International's Space Transportation Systems Division designed, developed, tested, and built the systems used to attach the Canadarm to the payload bay of the orbiter.

An acceptance ceremony for NASA was held at Spar's RMS Division in Toronto on 11 February 1981. Here Larkin Kerwin, then the head of the NRC, gave the SRMS the informal name, Canadarm. The term was originally coined by Dr. Wally Cherwinski for use by Larkin Kerwin during his speech at the press conference. The NRC Canadarm Project Manager, Dr. Art Hunter, worked with colleagues, NASA and Spar, to add the Canadian flag and wordmark onto the arm to fly Canadian colours with those of the USA.

The first Canadarm was delivered to NASA in April 1981. Astronaut Judith Resnik developed the NASA software and onboard operating procedures for the system. In all, five arms – Nos. 201, 202, 301, 302, and 303 – were built and delivered to NASA. Arm 302 was lost in the Challenger accident.

== Design and capabilities ==
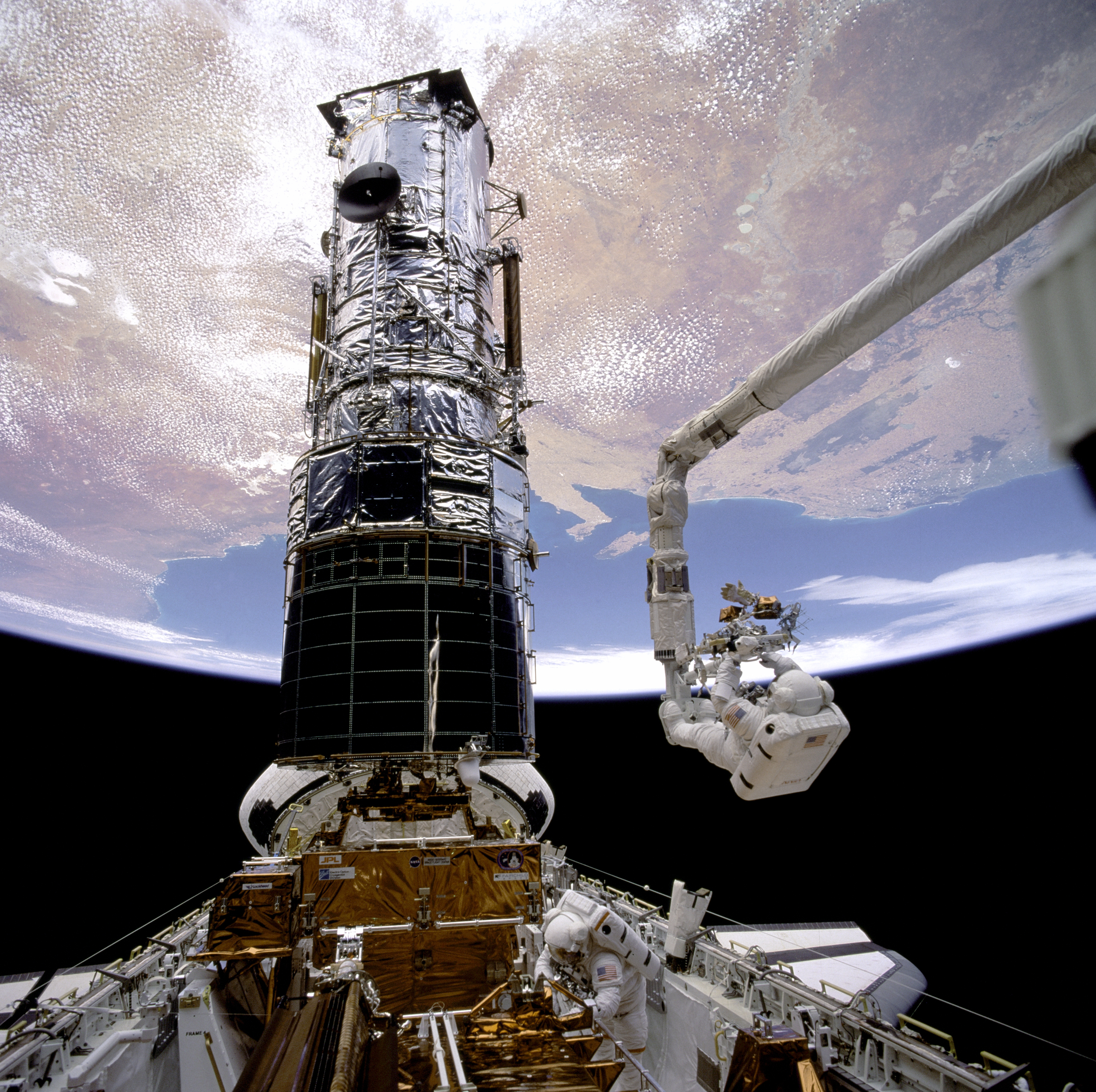
Story Musgrave, anchored on the end of the Canadarm, prepares to be elevated to the top of the Hubble Space Telescope during STS-61.

The original Canadarm was capable of deploying payloads weighing up to 65,000 pounds (29,000 kg) in space. In the mid-1990s, the arm control system was redesigned to increase the payload capability to 586,000 pounds (266,000 kg) in order to support space station assembly operations. While able to maneuver payloads with the mass of a loaded bus in space, the arm motors cannot lift the arm's own weight when on the ground. NASA, therefore, developed a model of the arm for use at its training facility within the Johnson Space Center located in Houston, Texas. The Canadarm can eliminate dangerous spacewalks, act as an orbital scaffold, launch and catch satellites, build space stations, grab supply ships, carry spacewalking astronauts, check for damage, and more. It lifts new satellites out of a spacecraft and lets them go into orbit. It can also reach out to grab broken satellites so astronauts can fix them.

It can even retrieve, repair and deploy satellites, provide a mobile extension ladder for extravehicular activity crew members for work stations or foot restraints, and be used as an inspection aid to allow the flight crew members to view the orbiter's or payload's surfaces through a television camera on the Canadarm.

The basic Canadarm configuration consists of a manipulator arm, a Canadarm display, and a control panel, including rotational and translational hand controllers at the orbiter aft flight deck flight crew station, and a manipulator controller interface unit that interfaces with the orbiter computer. One crew member operates the Canadarm from the aft flight deck control station, and a second crew member usually assists with television camera operations. This allows the Canadarm operator to view Canadarm operations through the aft flight deck payload and overhead windows and through the closed-circuit television monitors at the aft flight deck station.

The Canadarm is outfitted with an explosive-based mechanism to allow the arm to be jettisoned. This safety system would have allowed the Orbiter's payload bay doors to be closed in the event that the arm failed in an extended position and was not able to be retracted.

The Canadarm is 15.2 metres (50 ft) long and 38 centimetres (15 in) diameter with six degrees of freedom. It weighs 410 kilograms (900 lb) by itself, and 450 kilograms (990 lb) as part of the total system. The Canadarm has six joints that correspond roughly to the joints of the human arm, with shoulder yaw and pitch joints, an elbow pitch joint, and wrist pitch, yaw, and roll joints. The end effector is the unit at the end of the wrist that grapples the payload's grapple fixture. The two lightweight boom segments are called the upper and lower arms. The upper boom connects the shoulder and elbow joints, and the lower boom connects the elbow and wrist joints.

== Service history ==
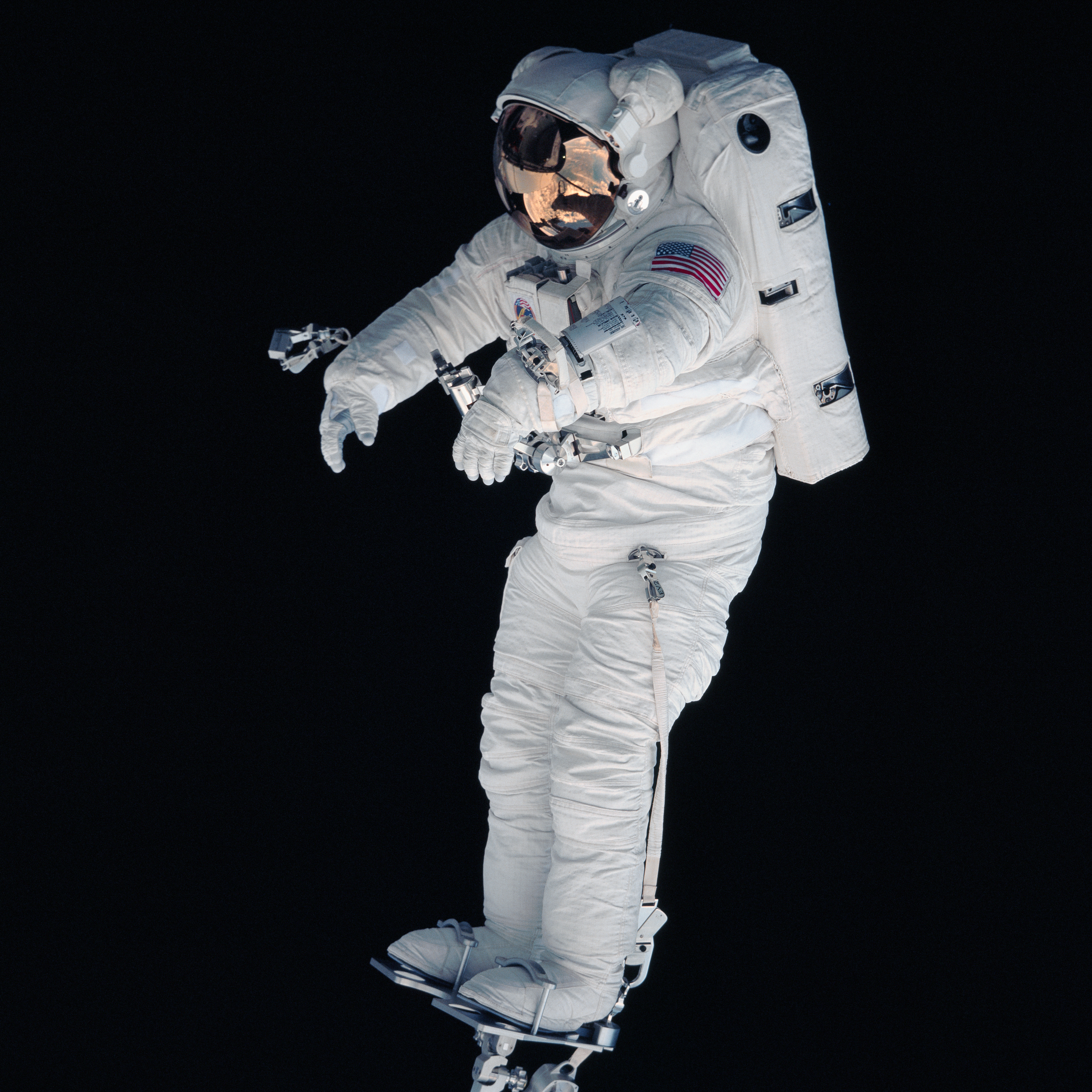
Peter J.K. Wisoff on the end of the arm, 1993

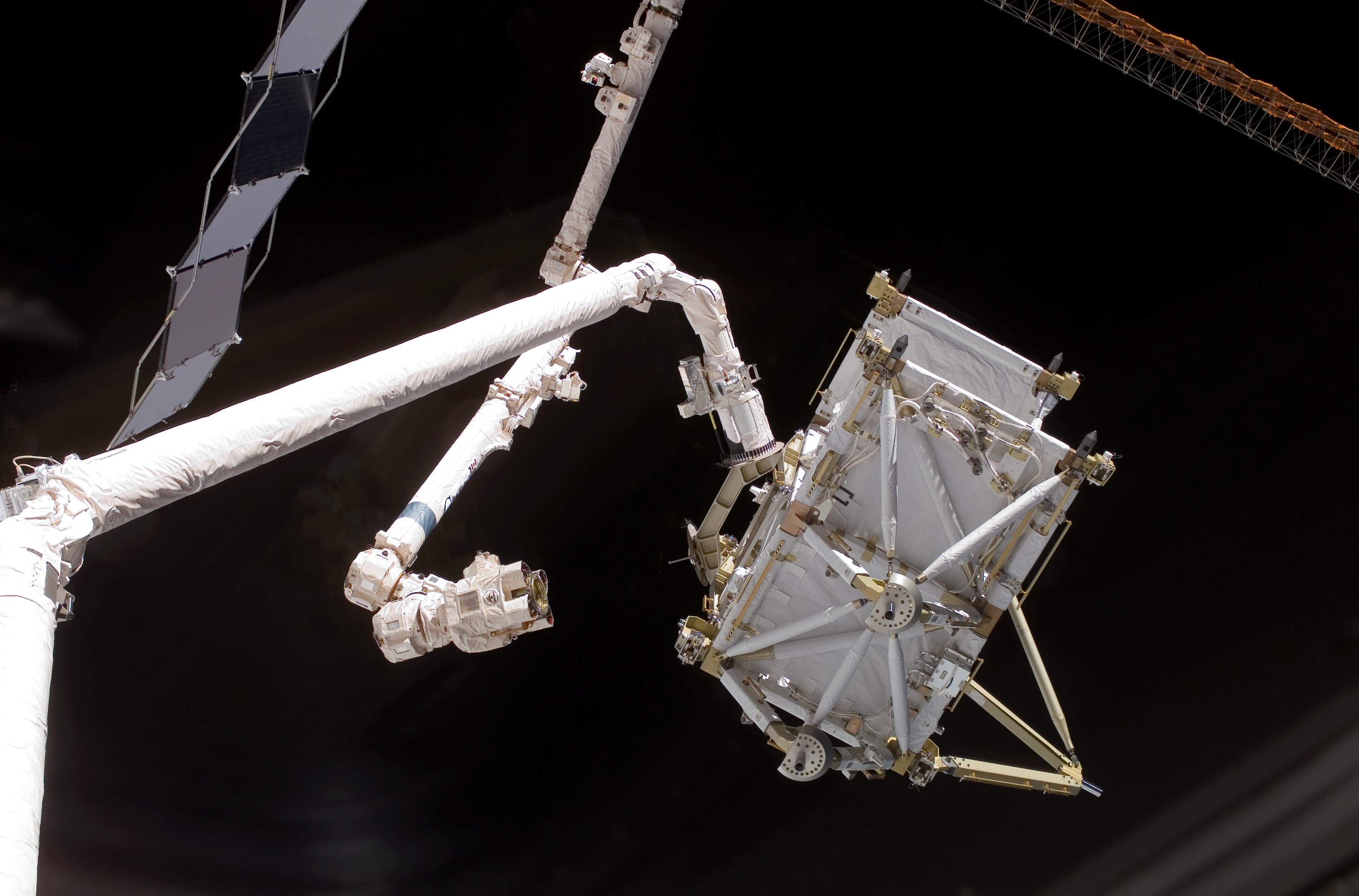
The Canadarm2 moves toward a P5 truss section, being held by Discovery's Canadarm, in preparation for a hand-off during STS-116.

A simulated Canadarm installed on the Space Shuttle Enterprise was seen when the prototype orbiter's payload bay doors were open to test hangar facilities early in the Space Shuttle program. The Canadarm was first tested in orbit in 1981, on Space Shuttle Columbia's STS-2 mission. Its first operational use was on STS-3 to deploy and manoeuvre the Plasma Diagnostics Package. The Canadarm subsequently flew on more than 90 missions with all five orbiters.

Since the installation of the Canadarm2 on the International Space Station (ISS), the two arms have been used to hand over segments of the station for assembly from the orbiter's Canadarm to the Canadarm2; the use of both elements in tandem has earned the nickname of "Canadian Handshake" in the media.

=== Retirement ===
The Canadarm's 90th and final Shuttle mission was in July 2011 on STS-135, delivering the Raffaello MPLM to the ISS and back. It is on display at Johnson space center in Texas Discovery's Canadarm is displayed next to it in the National Air and Space Museum's Udvar-Hazy Center. Endeavour left its OBSS at the International Space Station as part of its final mission, while its Canadarm was originally going to be displayed in the headquarters of the Canadian Space Agency (CSA). However, Endeavour's Canadarm is now on permanent display at the Canada Aviation and Space Museum in Ottawa. The last of the Canadarms to fly in space, the SRMS flown aboard Atlantis on STS-135 in July 2011, was shipped to NASA's Johnson Space Center in Houston for engineering study and possible reuse on a future mission.

== Derivatives ==
=== Canadarm2 ===
Based on the Canadarm1, the larger Canadarm2 is used for berthing the trusses, berthing the commercial vehicles, and inspecting the whole International Space Station.

=== Canadarm3 ===
The smaller Canadarm3 was planned to be used for berthing the modules, performing maintenance or repairs and inspecting the Lunar Gateway. In June 2024, the full contract for design and construction of the arm was awarded to MDA Space. On May 2, 2025, the project was canceled as a result of the second Trump administration's FY26 budget proposal, which resulted in the termination of the Lunar Gateway Program.

== In popular media ==
- On November 13, 2012, Google Canada displayed a doodle on its home search page to celebrate the 31st anniversary of the Canadarm's first use in space.
- Starting November 7, 2013, Canadarm2 was included on the back of the Canadian five dollar note.

== See also ==
- List of Canadian inventions and discoveries
- Dextre – Robotic arm on ISS
- European Robotic Arm – Robotic arm installed on the ISS
- Kibo (ISS module) § Remote Manipulator System
- Mobile Servicing System – Robotic system on board the International Space Station
- Strela – Robotic arm installed on the ISS
