= Mobile Servicing System =

Robotic system on board the International Space Station

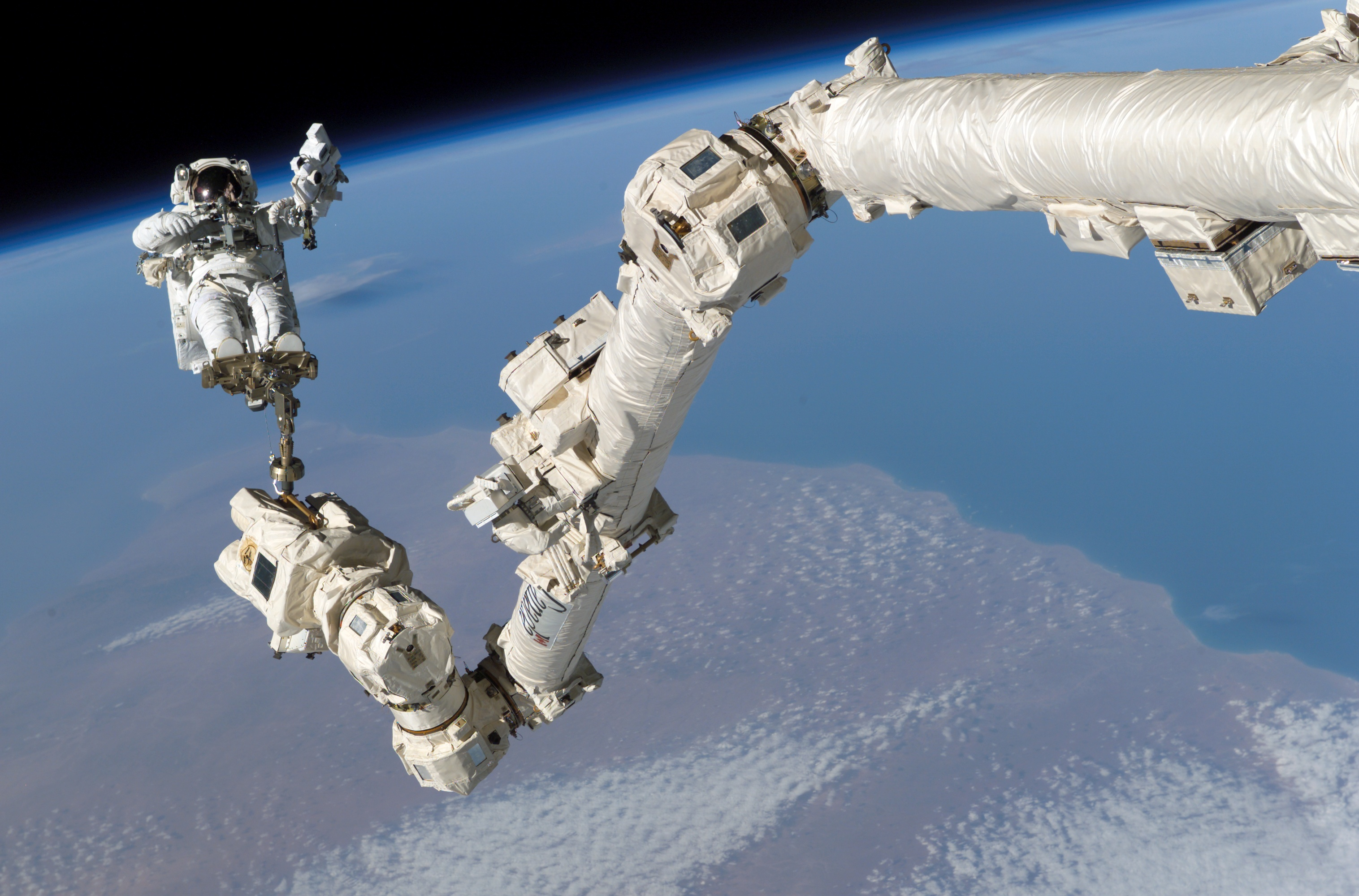
Astronaut Stephen K. Robinson anchored to the end of the Canadarm2 during STS-114, 2005

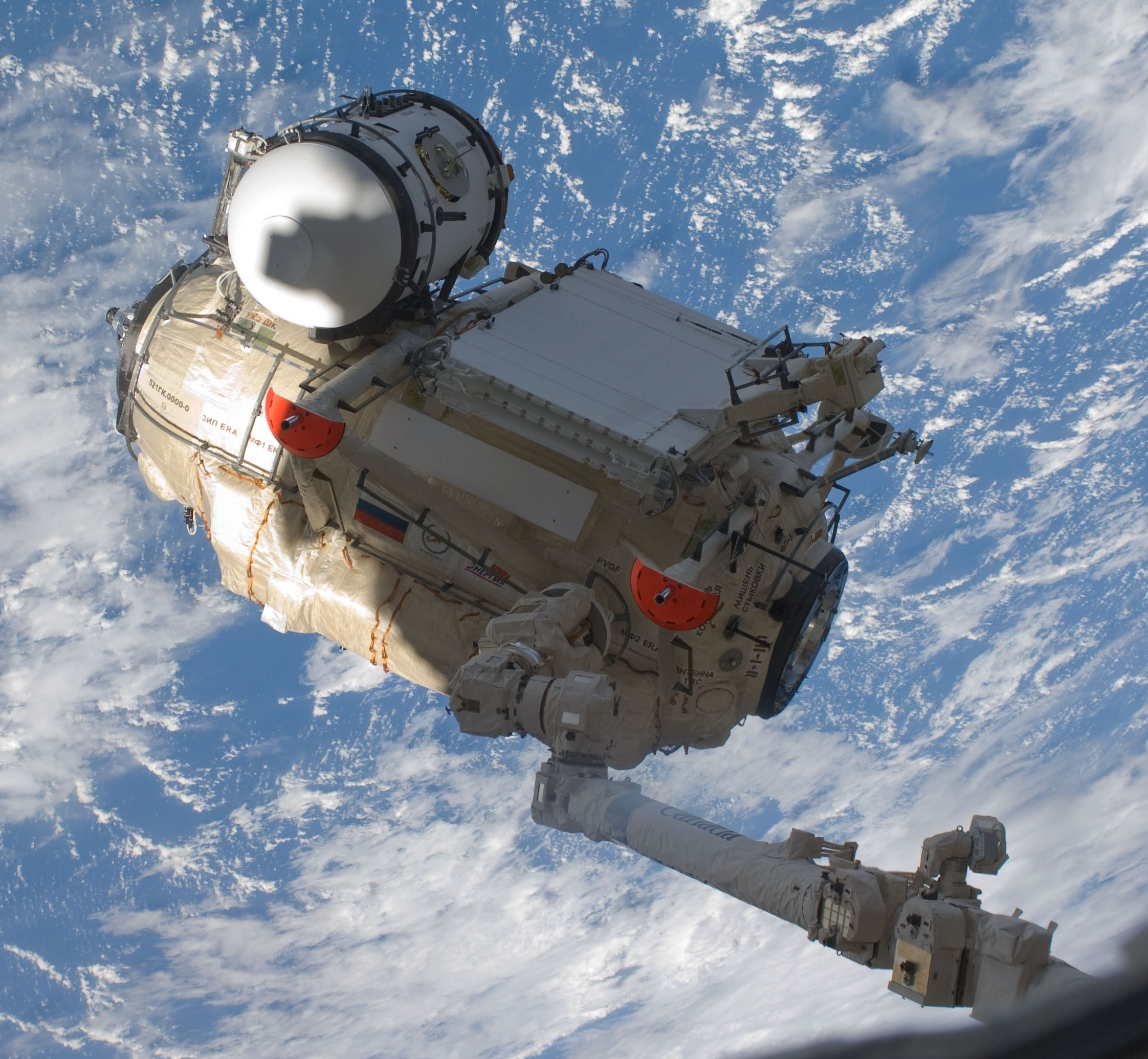
Canadarm2 moves Rassvet to berth with the station on STS-132, 2010

The Mobile Servicing System (MSS) is a robotic system on board the International Space Station (ISS). Launched to the ISS in 2001, it plays a key role in station assembly and maintenance; it moves equipment and supplies around the station, supports astronauts working in space, services instruments and other payloads attached to the ISS, and is used for external maintenance. Astronauts receive specialized training to perform these functions with the various systems of the MSS.

The MSS is composed of three components:

- the Space Station Remote Manipulator System (SSRMS), known as Canadarm2.
- the Mobile Remote Servicer Base System (MBS).
- the Special Purpose Dexterous Manipulator (SPDM, also known as "Dextre" or "Canada hand").

The system can move along rails on the Integrated Truss Structure on top of the US-provided Mobile Transporter cart, which hosts the MRS Base System. The system's control software was written in the Ada 95 programming language.

The MSS was designed and manufactured by MDA (previously divisions of MacDonald Dettwiler Associates called MDA Space Missions, MD Robotics, and previously called SPAR Aerospace) for the Canadian Space Agency's contribution to the International Space Station.

== Canadarm2 ==
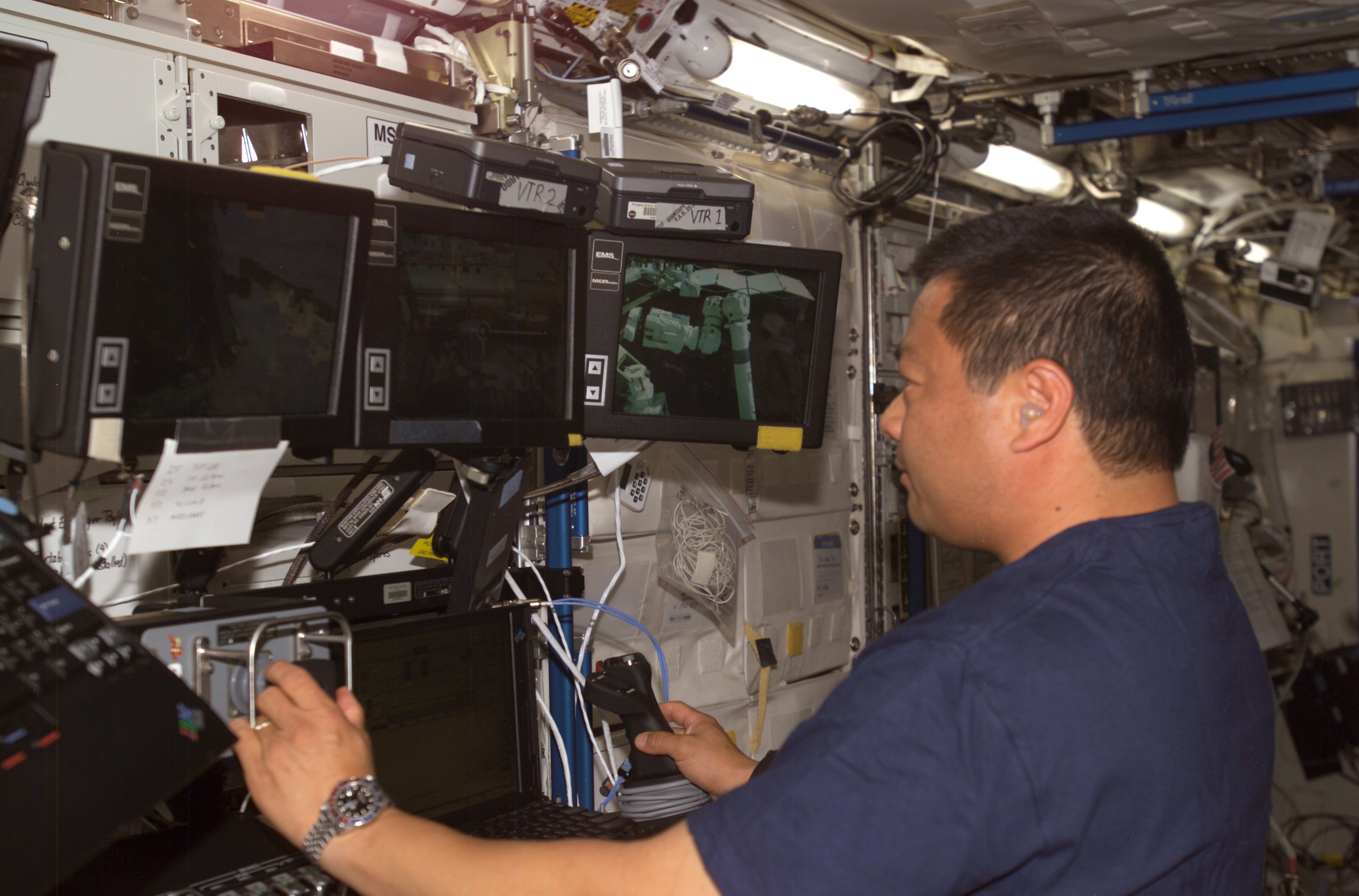
Astronaut Leroy Chiao controlling Canadarm2 from the Destiny lab

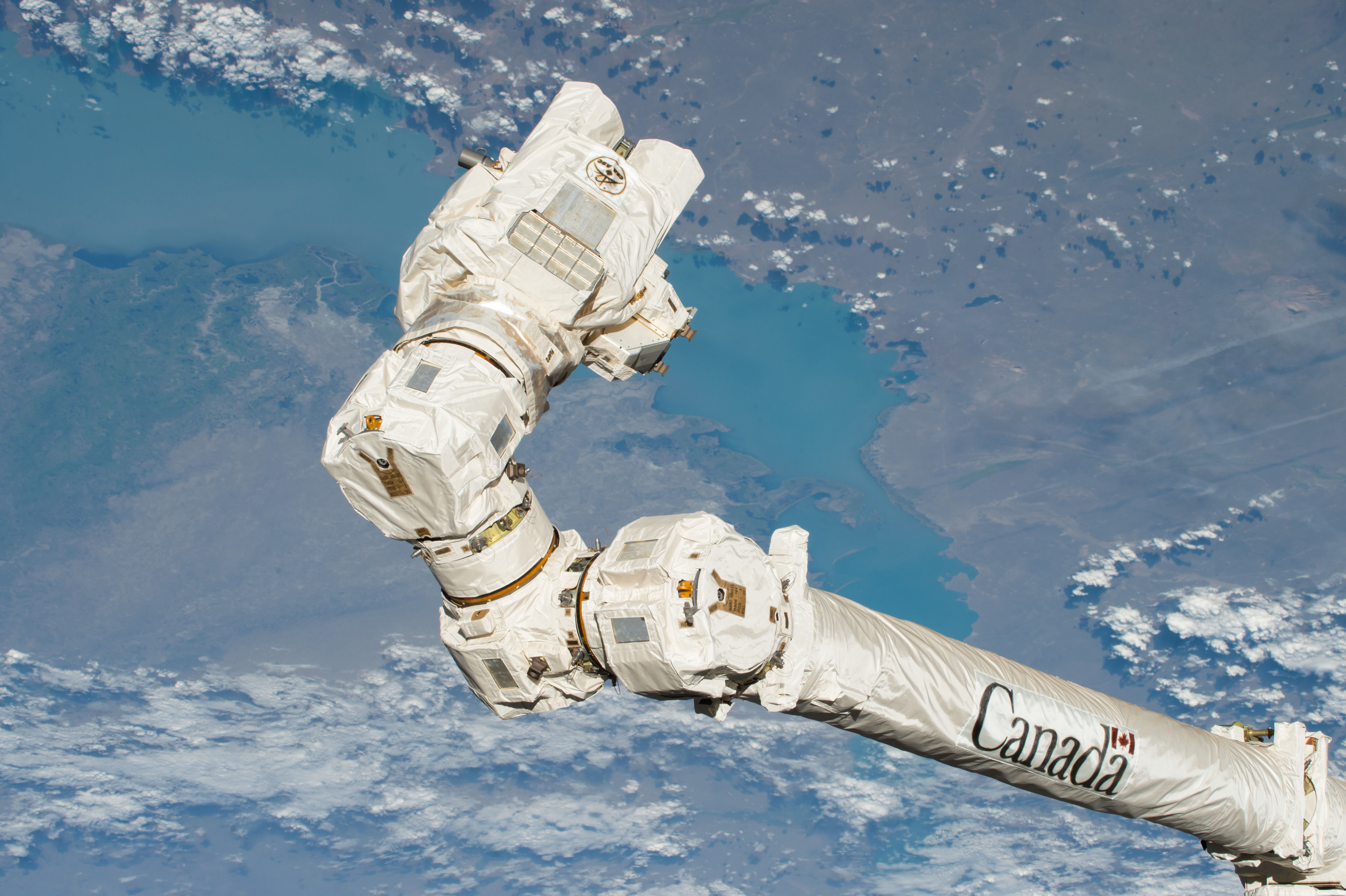
The exterior of the Canadarm is clad with Kevlar fabric, while the arm itself is made from titanium, pictured above Lake Balkhash.

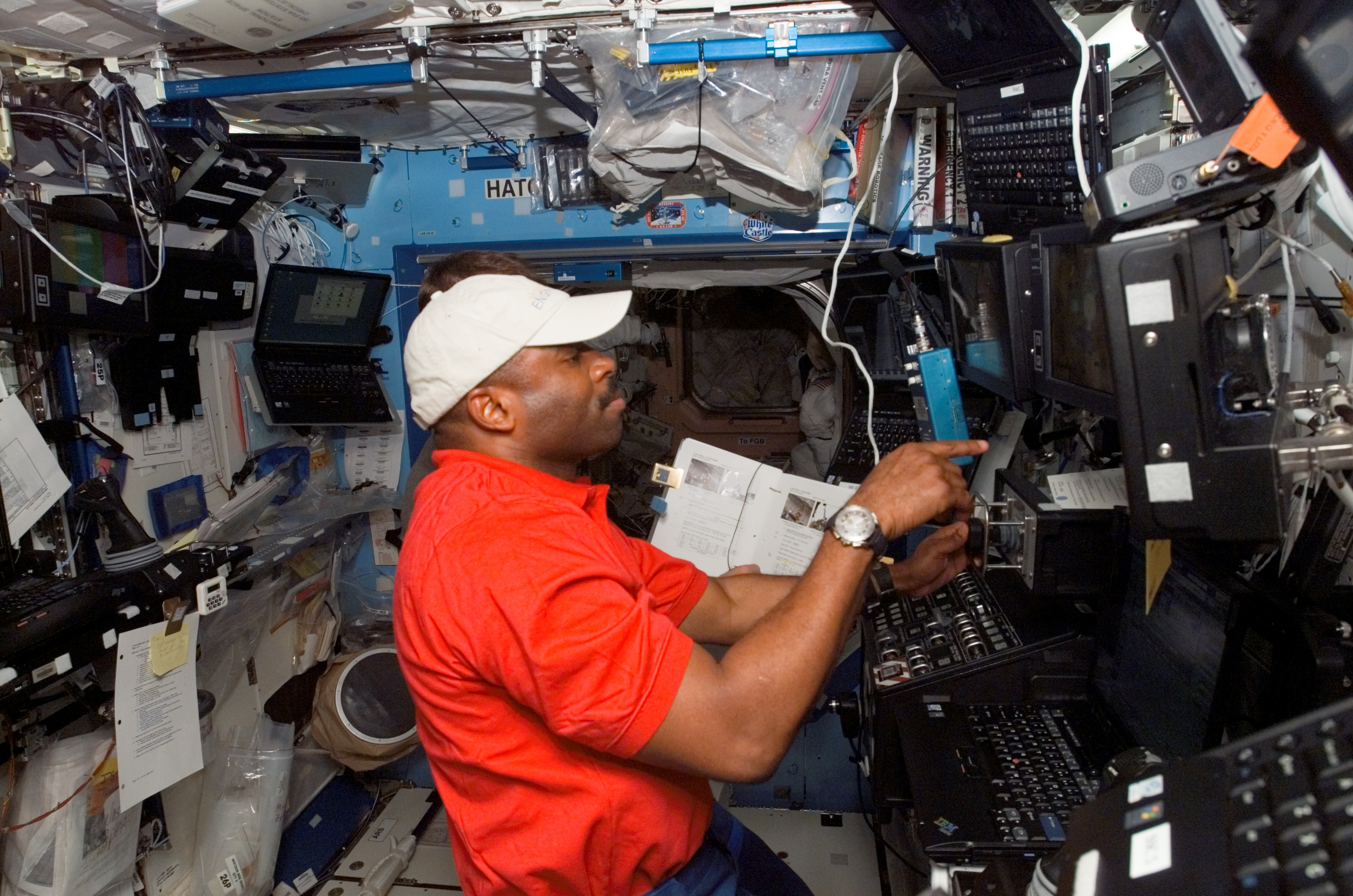
Leland Melvin working on the robotic control computers

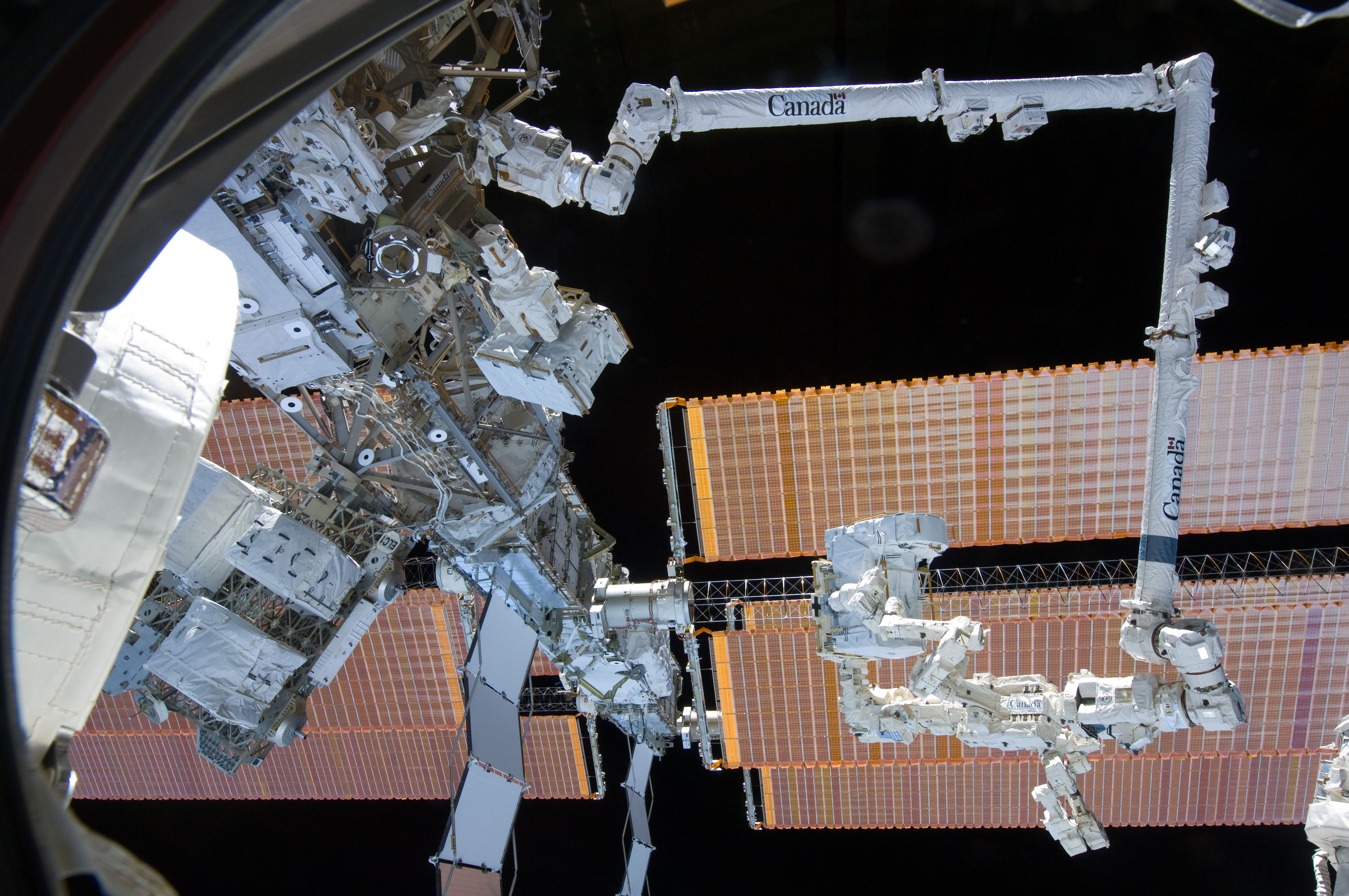
A unique view of the whole arm, MBS and Dextre, grappling containers while near the massive solar arrays

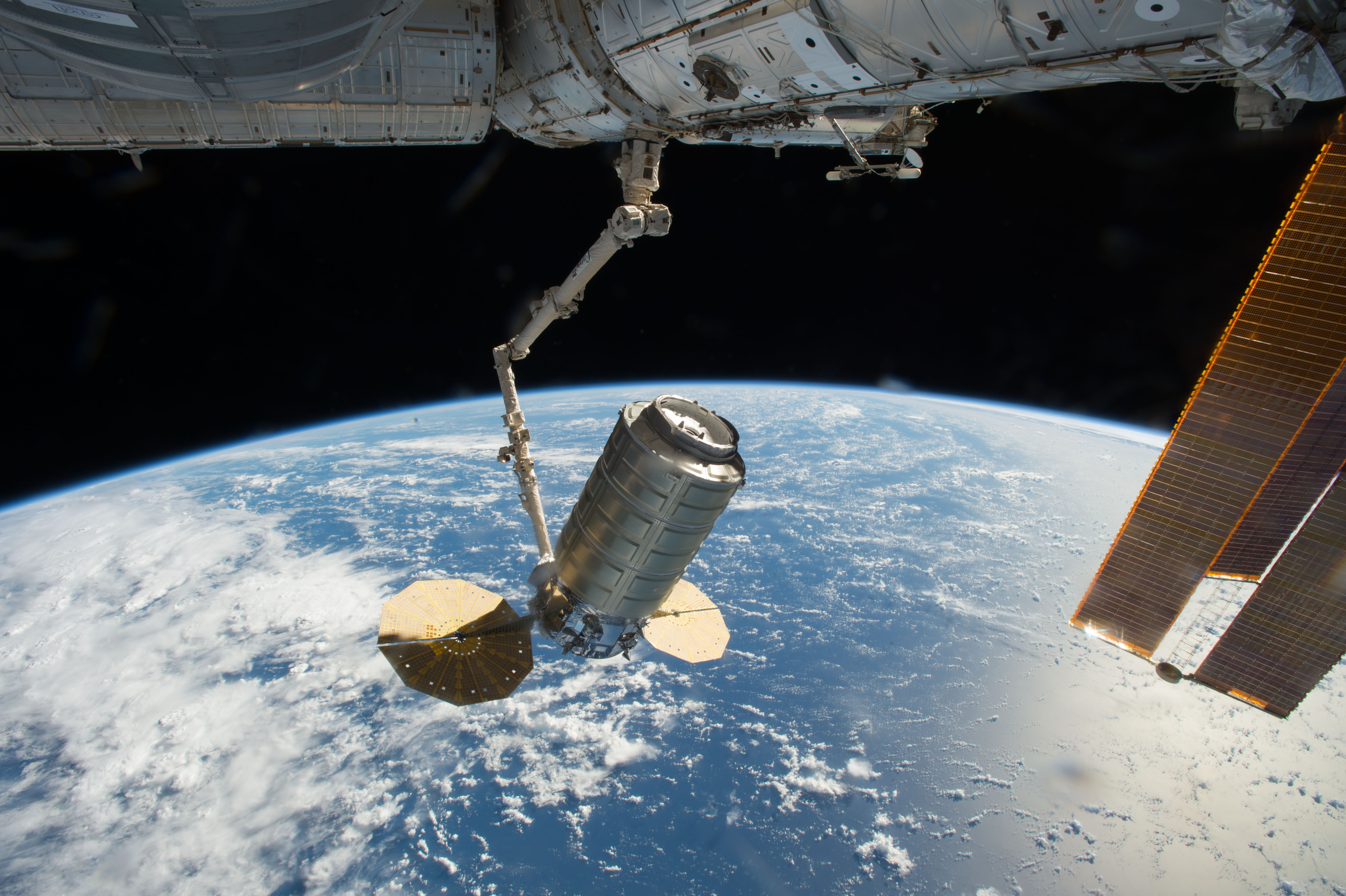
Canadarm2 captures Cygnus OA-5 S.S. Alan Poindexter in late 2016

Officially known as the Space Station Remote Manipulator System (SSRMS), Canadarm2 was launched on STS-100 in April 2001. This second generation arm is a larger, more advanced version of the Space Shuttle's original Canadarm. Canadarm2 is 17.6 m (58 ft) when fully extended and has seven motorized joints (an 'elbow' hinge in the middle, and three rotary joints at each of the 'wrist/shoulder' ends). It has a mass of 1,800 kg (4,000 lb), a diameter of 35 cm (14 in), and is made from titanium. The arm can handle large payloads of up to 116,000 kg (256,000 lb) and could assist with docking the space shuttle. It is self-relocatable and can move end-over-end to reach many parts of the Space Station in an inchworm-like movement. In this movement, it is limited only by the number of Power Data Grapple Fixtures (PDGFs) on the station. PDGFs located around the station provide power, data and video to the arm through either of its two Latching End Effectors (LEEs). The arm can also travel the entire length of the space station truss using the Mobile Base System.

In addition to moving itself around the station, the arm can move any object with a grapple fixture. In construction of the station the arm was used to move large segments into place. It can also capture unpiloted ships like the SpaceX Dragon, the Cygnus spacecraft, and Japanese H-II Transfer Vehicle (HTV), which are equipped with a standard grapple fixture that the Canadarm2 uses to capture and berth the spacecraft. The arm is also used to unberth and release the spacecraft after use.

On-board operators see what they are doing by looking at the three Robotic Work Station (RWS) LCD screens. The MSS has two RWS units: one in the Destiny module and the other in the Cupola. Only one RWS controls the MSS at a time. The RWS has two sets of control joysticks: one Rotational Hand Controller (RHC) and one Translational Hand Controller (THC). In addition to this is the Display and Control Panel (DCP) and the Portable Computer System (PCS) laptop.

In recent years, the majority of robotic operations are commanded remotely by flight controllers at Christopher C. Kraft Jr. Mission Control Center or the Canadian Space Agency's John H. Chapman Space Centre. Operators can work in shifts to accomplish objectives with more flexibility than when done by on-board crew operators, albeit at a slower pace. Astronaut operators are used for time-critical operations such as visiting vehicle captures and robotics-supported extra-vehicular activity.

Some time before 12 May 2021 Canadarm2 was hit by a small piece of orbital debris, damaging its thermal blankets and one of the booms. Its operation appeared to be unaffected.

Canadarm 2 will also help to berth the Axiom Space Station modules to the ISS.

=== Latching End Effectors ===
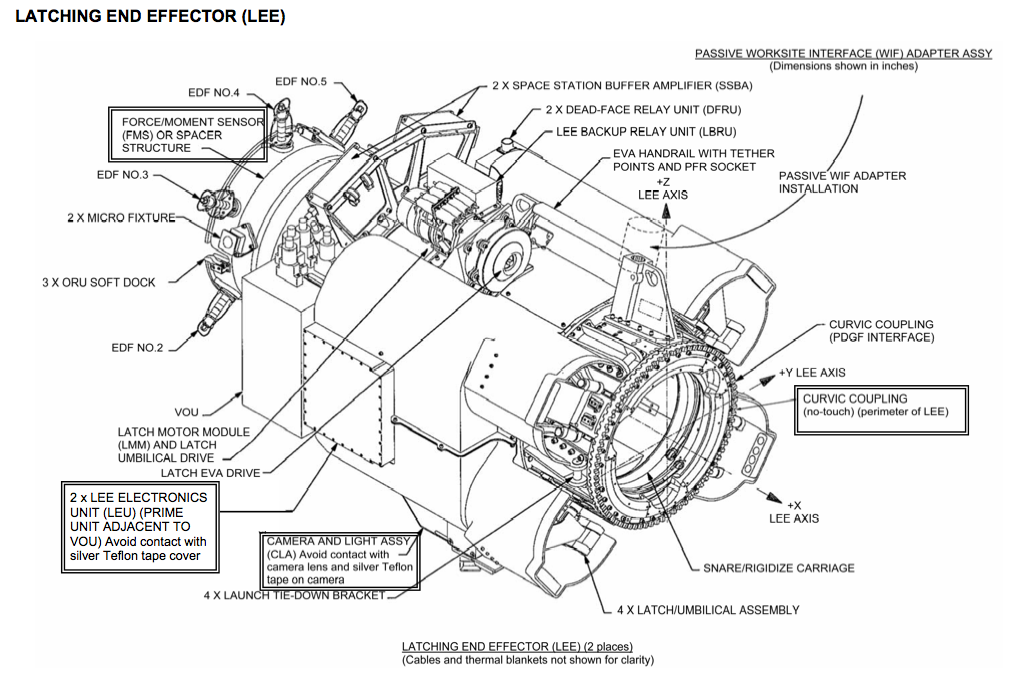
LEE drawing

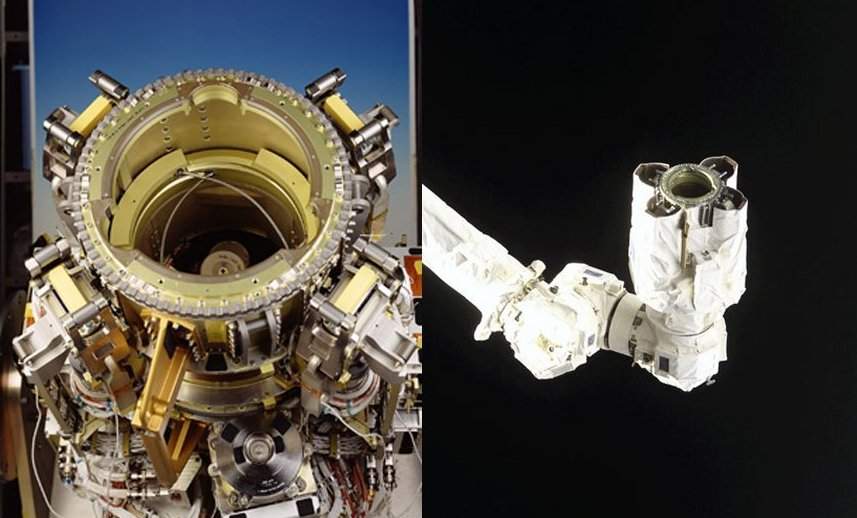
Latching end effector (LEE)

Canadarm2 has two LEEs, one at each end. A LEE has three snare wires to catch the grapple fixture shaft. Another LEE is on the Mobile Base System's Payload ORU Accommodations (POA) unit. The POA LEE is used to temporarily hold large ISS components. One more is on the Special Purpose Dexterous Manipulator (SPDM, also known as "Dextre" or "Canada hand"). Six LEEs have been manufactured and used in various locations on the ISS.

S/N	Initial location	Current location
201	LEE B	POA LEE
202	LEE A	Earth, to be refurbished for Ground Spare
203	POA LEE	LEE A
204	Spare stored on ELC1	LEE B
205	Earth, Ground Spare	Spare stored on exterior ISS
301	SPDM LEE	SPDM LEE

== Special Purpose Dexterous Manipulator ==
The Special Purpose Dexterous Manipulator or "Dextre" is a smaller two-armed robot that can attach to Canadarm2, the ISS, or the Mobile Base System. The arms and their power tools can handle delicate assembly tasks and change orbital replacement unit (ORUs) currently handled by astronauts during spacewalks. Although Canadarm2 can move around the station in an "inchworm motion", it is unable to carry anything with it unless Dextre is attached. Testing was done in the space simulation chambers of the Canadian Space Agency's David Florida Laboratory in Ottawa, Ontario. The manipulator was launched to the station on 11 March 2008 on STS-123.

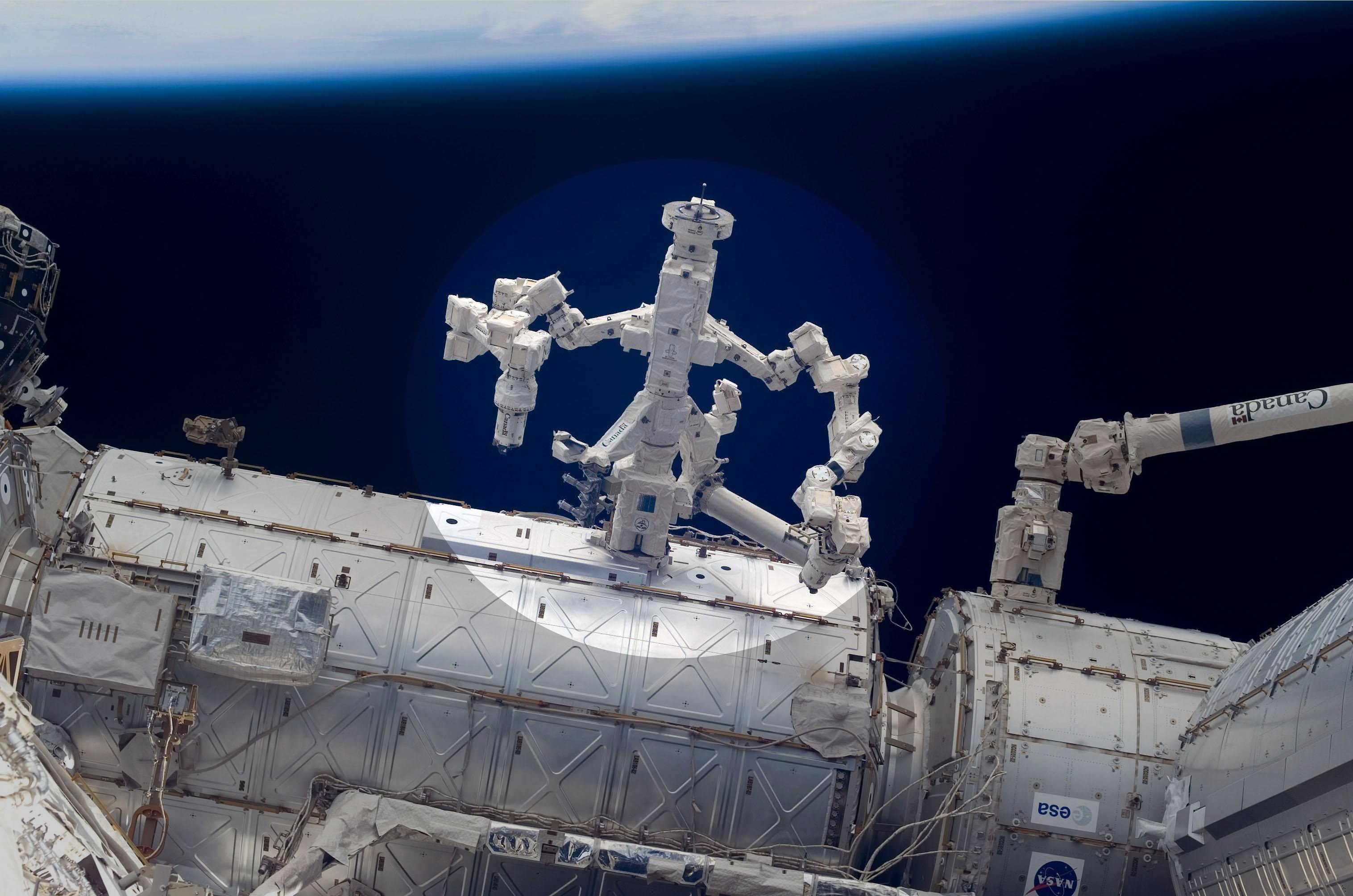
Dextre and Canadarm2 docked side by side on Power Data Grapple Fixtures

== Mobile Base System ==
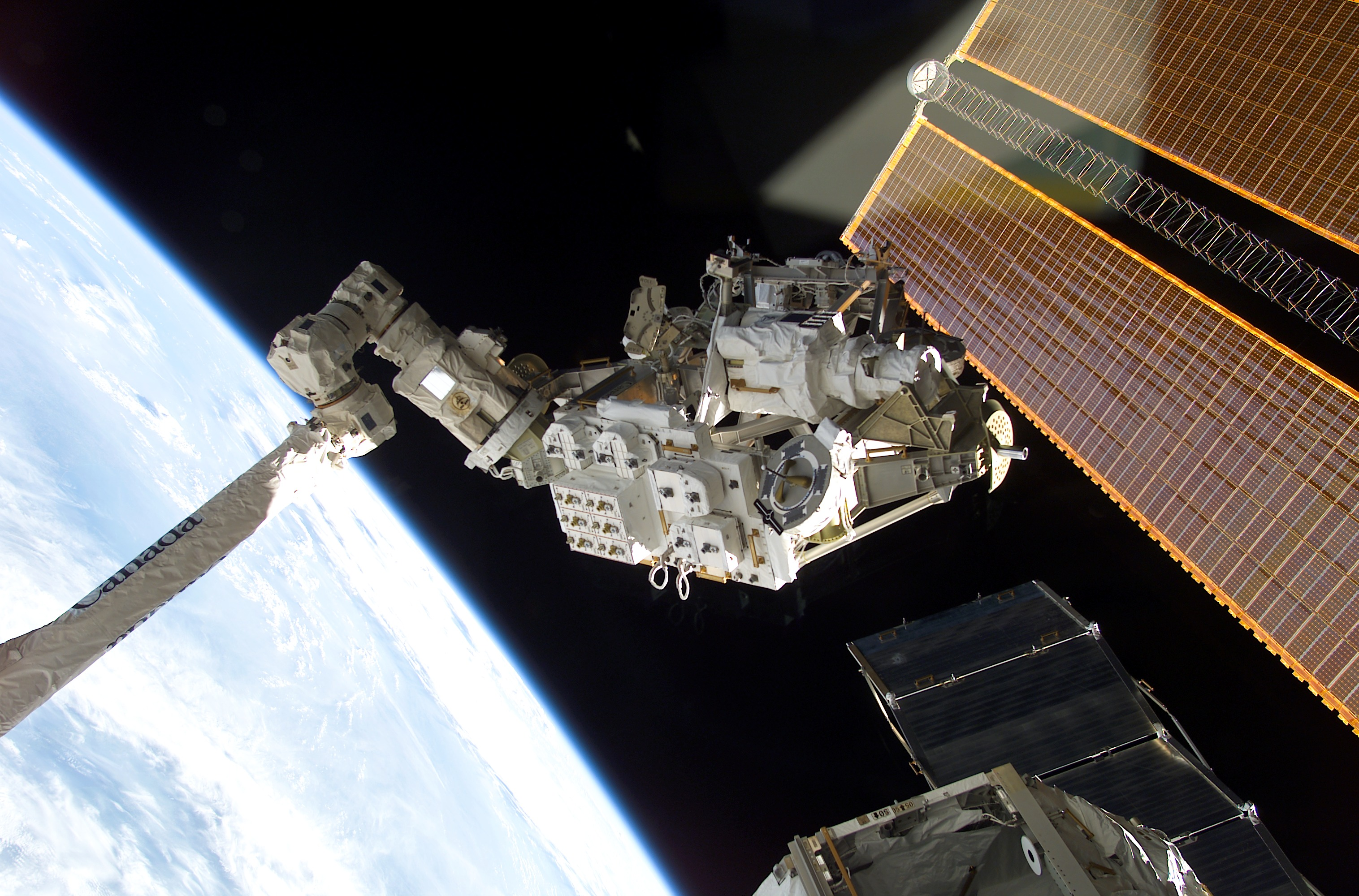
The Mobile Base System just before Canadarm2 installed it on the Mobile Transporter during STS-111

The Mobile Remote Servicer Base System (MBS) is a base platform for the robotic arms. It was added to the station during STS-111 in June 2002. The platform rests atop the Mobile Transporter (installed on STS-110, designed by Northrop Grumman in Carpinteria, California), which allows it to glide 108 metres down rails on the station's main truss. Canadarm2 can relocate by itself, but cannot carry at the same time. Dextre cannot relocate by itself. The MBS gives the two robotic arms the ability to travel to work sites all along the truss structure and to step off onto grapple fixtures along the way. When Canadarm2 and Dextre are attached to the MBS, they have a combined mass of 4,900 kg (10,800 lb). Like Canadarm2 it was built by MD Robotics, and it has a minimum service life of 15 years.

The MBS is equipped with four Power Data Grapple Fixtures, one at each of its four top corners. Any of these can be used as a base for the two robots, Canadarm2 and Dextre, as well as any of the payloads that might be held by them. The MBS also has two locations to attach payloads. The first is the Payload/Orbital Replacement Unit Accommodations (POA). This is a device that looks and functions much like the Latching End Effectors of Canadarm2. It can be used to park, power and command any payload with a grapple fixture, while keeping Canadarm2 free to do something else. The other attachment location is the MBS Common Attachment System (MCAS). This is another type of attachment system that is used to host scientific experiments.

The MBS also supports astronauts during extravehicular activities. It has locations to store tools and equipment, foot-restraints, handrails and safety tether attachment points as well as a camera assembly. If needed, it is even possible for an astronaut to "ride" the MBS while it moves at a top speed of about 1.5 meters per minute. On either side of the MBS are the Crew and Equipment Translation Aids. These carts ride on the same rails as the MBS. Astronauts ride them manually during EVAs to transport equipment and to facilitate their movements around the station.

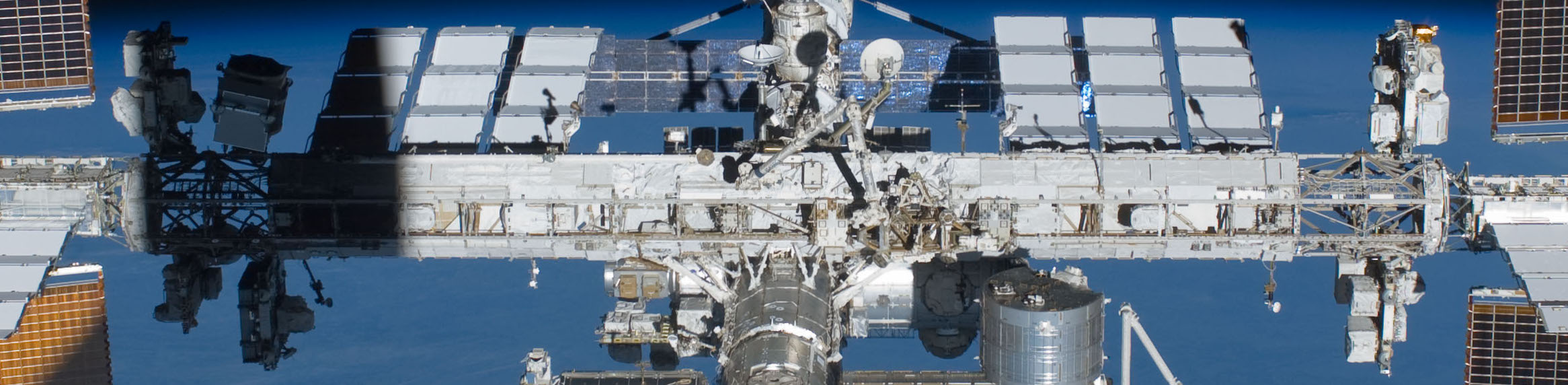
Canadarm2 riding the Mobile Base System along the Mobile Transporter railway, running the length of the station's main truss

== Enhanced ISS Boom Assembly ==
Installed on May 27, 2011, is a 15-metre (50 ft) boom with handrails and inspection cameras, attached to the end of Canadarm2.

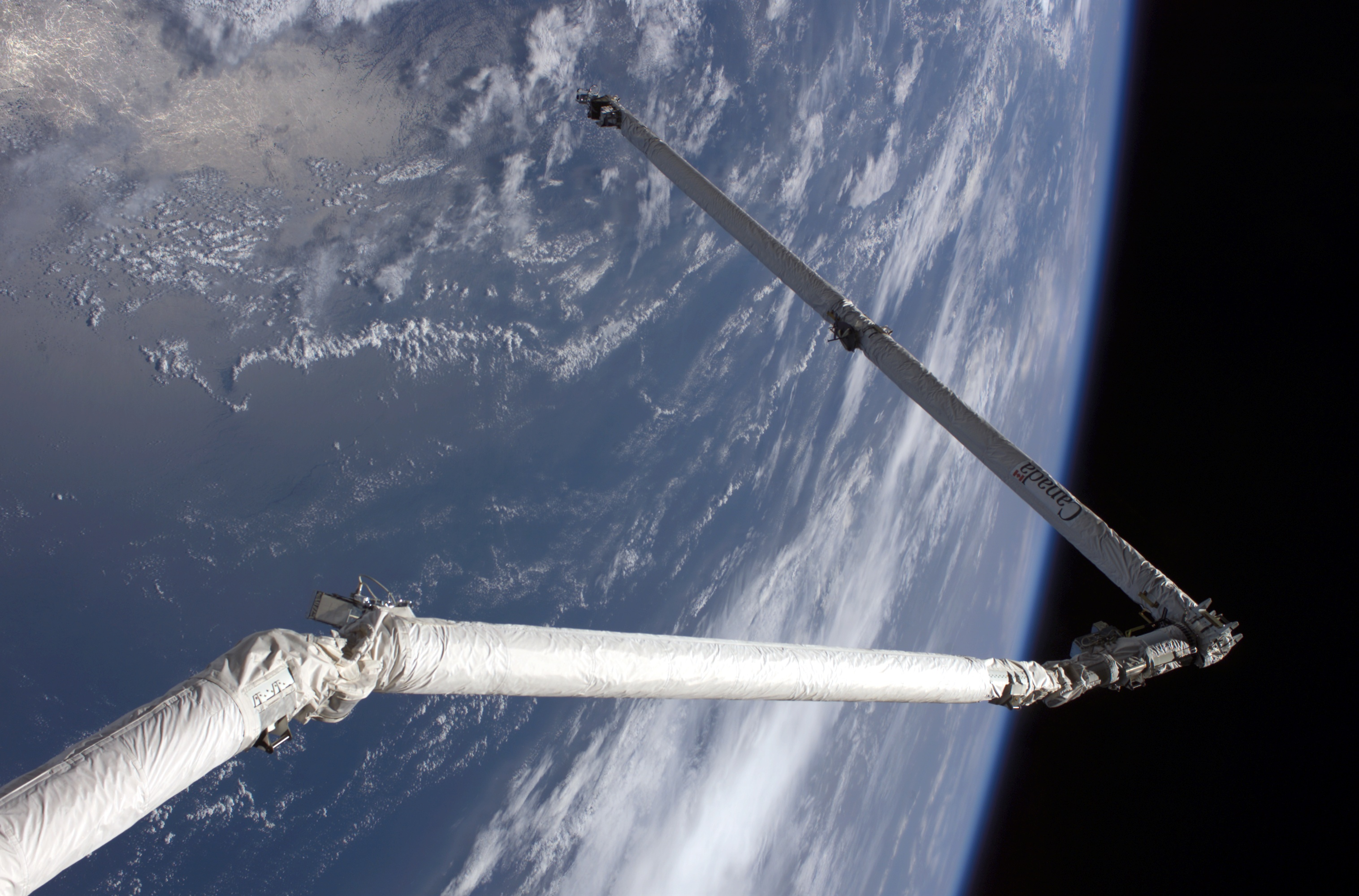
Shuttle Remote Manipulator System (RMS) holding OBSS boom on STS-114

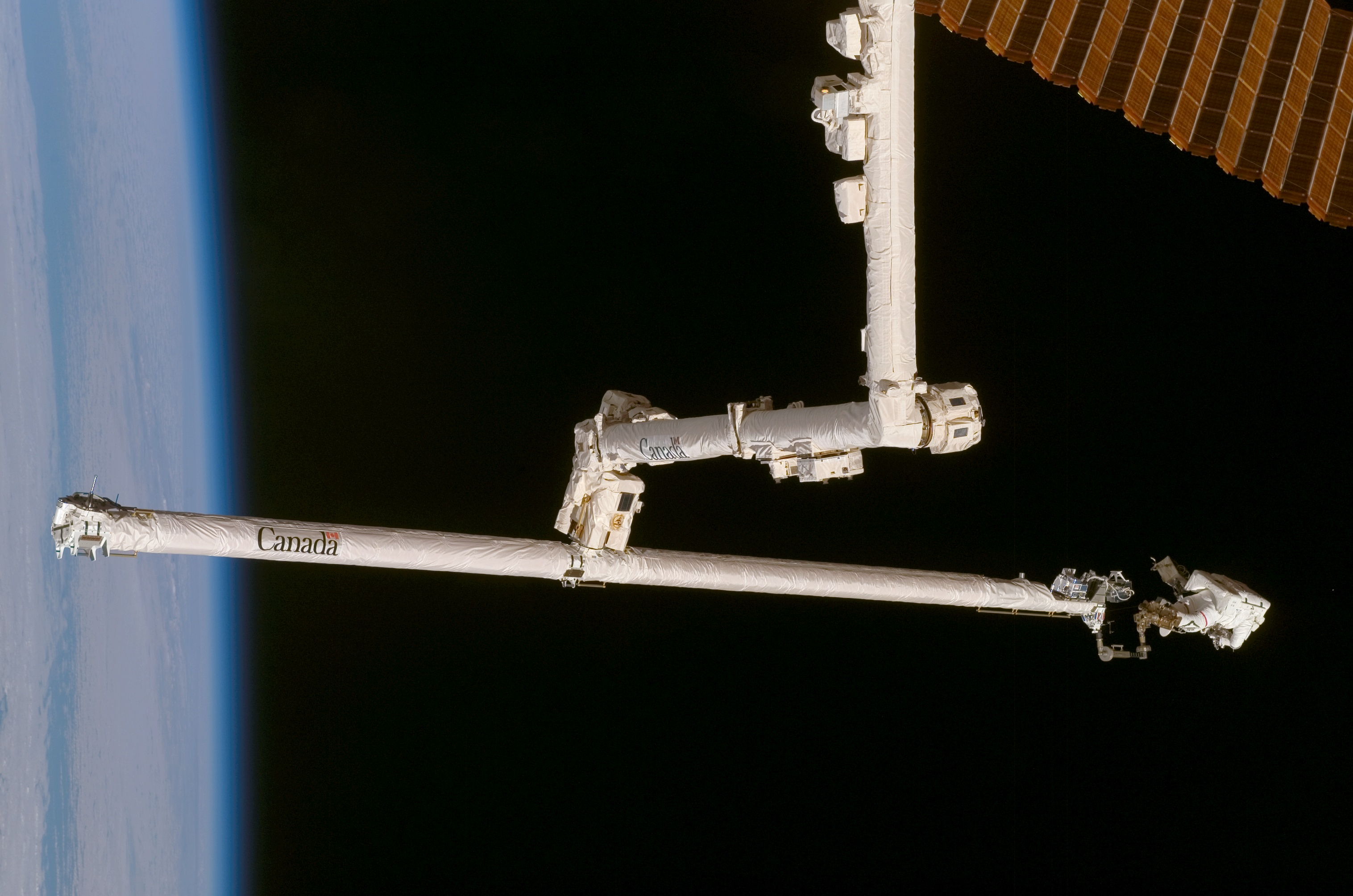
Astronaut Scott Parazynski (at right) riding the OBSS boom to repair the solar array during STS-120

== Other ISS robotics ==
The station received a second robotic arm during STS-124, the Japanese Experiment Module Remote Manipulator System (JEM-RMS). The JEM-RMS is primarily used to service the JEM Exposed Facility. An additional robotic arm, the European Robotic Arm (ERA) was launched alongside the Russian-built Multipurpose Laboratory Module on July 15, 2021.

Originally connected to Pirs, the ISS also has two Strela cargo cranes. One of the cranes could be extended to reach the end of Zarya. The other could extend to the opposite side and reach the end of Zvezda. The first crane was assembled in space during STS-96 and STS-101. The second crane was launched alongside Pirs itself. The cranes were later moved to the docking compartment Poisk and Zarya module.

=== List of cranes ===
Name	Agency or Company	Launch
Canadarm 2	Canadian Space Agency	April 19, 2001
Dextre	Canadian Space Agency	March 11, 2008

== See also ==
- MacDonald Dettwiler and Associates (MDA), the manufacturers of Canadarm2
- Canadarm, which was used on the Space Shuttle Orbiters
- European Robotic Arm, a third robotic arm installed on the ISS
- The Remote Manipulator System, used on the ISS module Kibo
- Dextre, also known as the Special Purpose Dexterous Manipulator (SPDM), used on the ISS
- Strela, a crane used on the ISS to perform similar tasks as the Mobile Servicing System
