= Grapple fixture =

Spacecraft connection for robotic arms

Black is compatible with the SSRMS, SRMS and JEMRMS. Blue is compatible with SRMS and JEMRMS. Red is compatible with SSRMS.

Grapple fixtures are used on spacecraft or other objects to provide a secure connection for a robotic arm.

== North America ==
The fixtures allowed the Space Shuttle's Canadarm (also known as the Shuttle Remote Manipulator System, or SRMS) to safely grapple large objects (e.g. ISS components, or satellites e.g. HST).

They currently do the same for the International Space Station's Space Station Remote Manipulator System (SSRMS) (also known as Canadarm2) and the Japanese Experiment Module Remote Manipulator System (JEMRMS).

The grapple fixtures are flat in appearance, with a central grapple pin topped with a sphere which the snares in the end of the arms latch on to. They use three "ramps" that help guide the robotic arm correctly onto the grapple fixture.

=== Development ===
The North American grapple fixture was developed at Spar Aerospace in the 1970s. Its invention is credited to Frank Mee, who also invented the Canadarm end effector for the Space Shuttle. The Grapple Fixture design was further refined by Barrie Teb.

=== Variants ===
==== Flight-Releasable Grapple Fixture ====
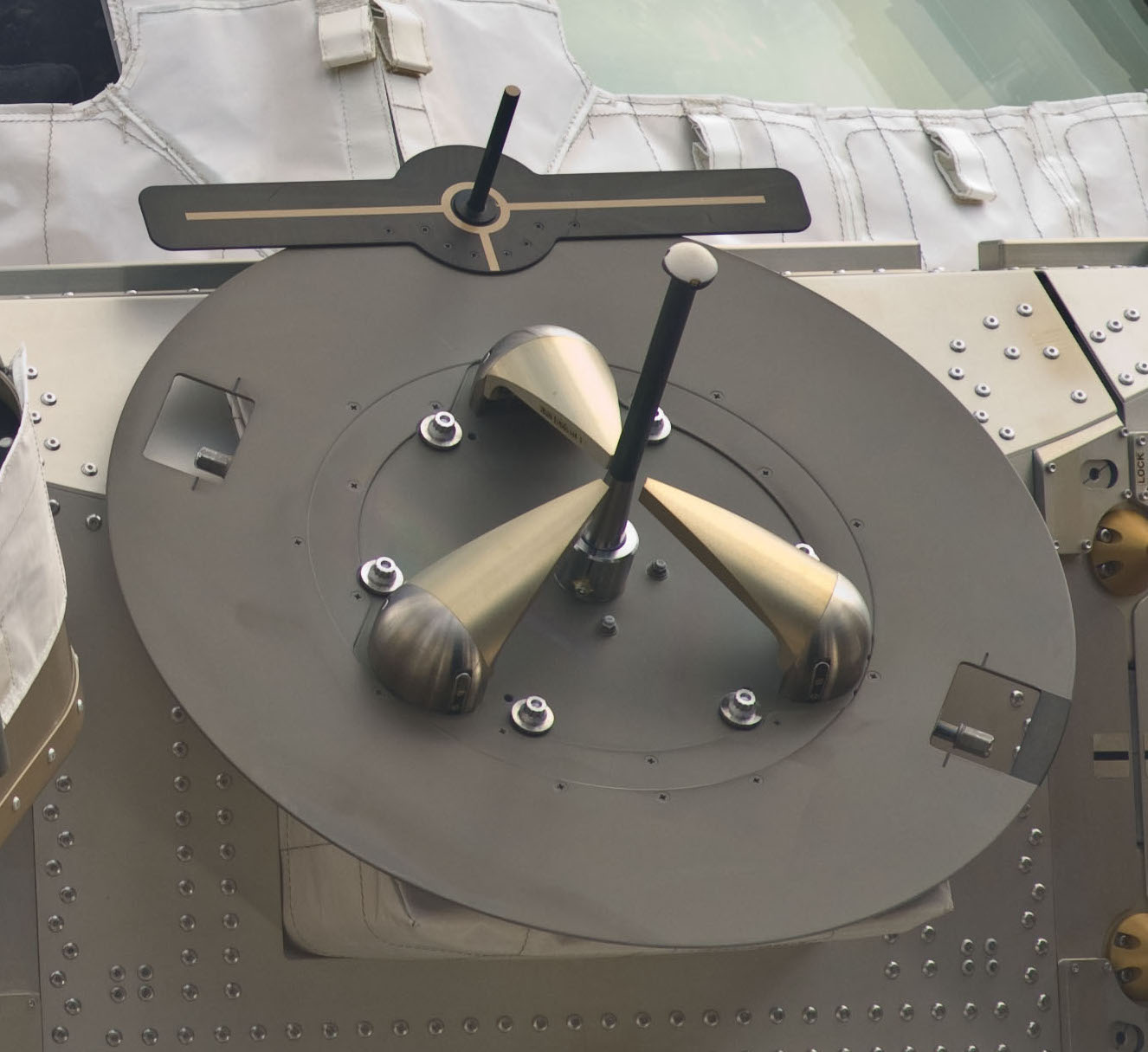
Flight-Releasable Grapple Fixture

The Flight-Releasable Grapple Fixture (FRGF) is the simplest variation of the North American grapple fixture, it allows only for grappling and does not have any electrical connectors. Its use began early in the Space Shuttle program and was developed from the Flight Standard Grapple Fixture (FSGF) by allowing the Grapple Shaft to be installed during extravehicular activity (EVA).

Unpiloted ships like the SpaceX Dragon, Orbital ATK Cygnus and Japanese H-II Transfer Vehicle include a standard FRGF which is used by the Canadarm2 to grapple the capsule on approach to the International Space Station for berthing. The fixture can have a maximum payload rating of 65,000 pounds or 30,000 kg. An orbital replacement unit may also have a grapple fixture.

==== Latchable Grapple Fixture ====
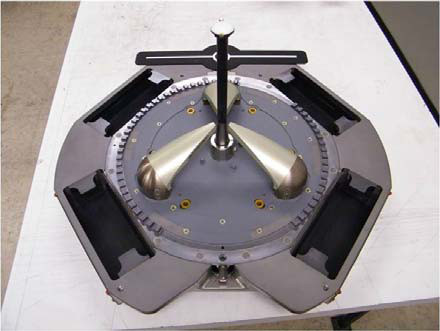
Latchable Grapple Fixture

The Latchable Grapple Fixture (LGF) allows for grappling and latching, intended to be used for longer‐term stowage on the Payload Orbital replacement unit Accommodation (POA) (greater than 3 weeks). It does not have any electrical connectors.

==== Electrical Flight Grapple Fixture and Electro Mechanical Grapple Fixture ====
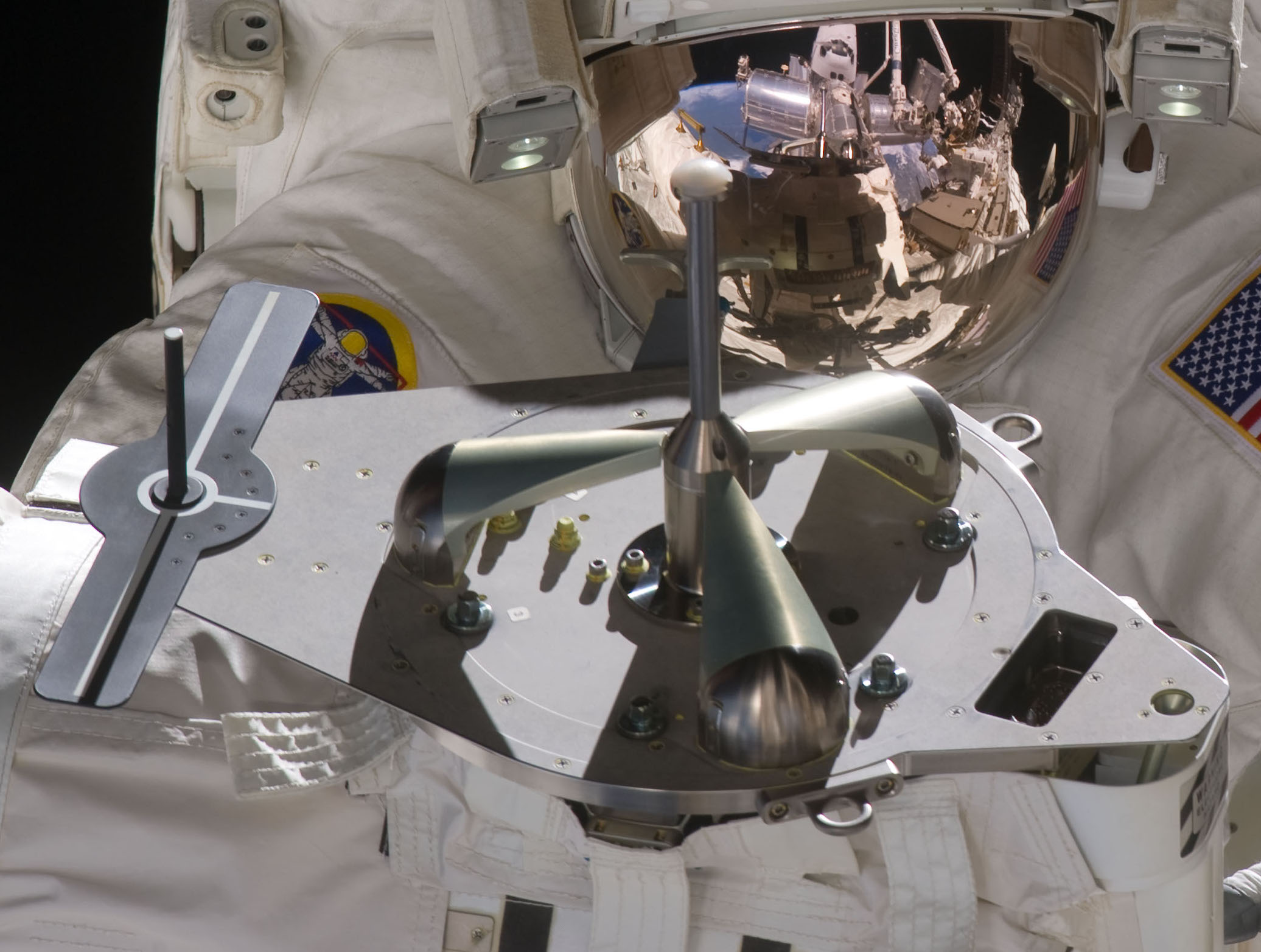
Electrical Flight Grapple Fixture used on the Space Shuttle's boom

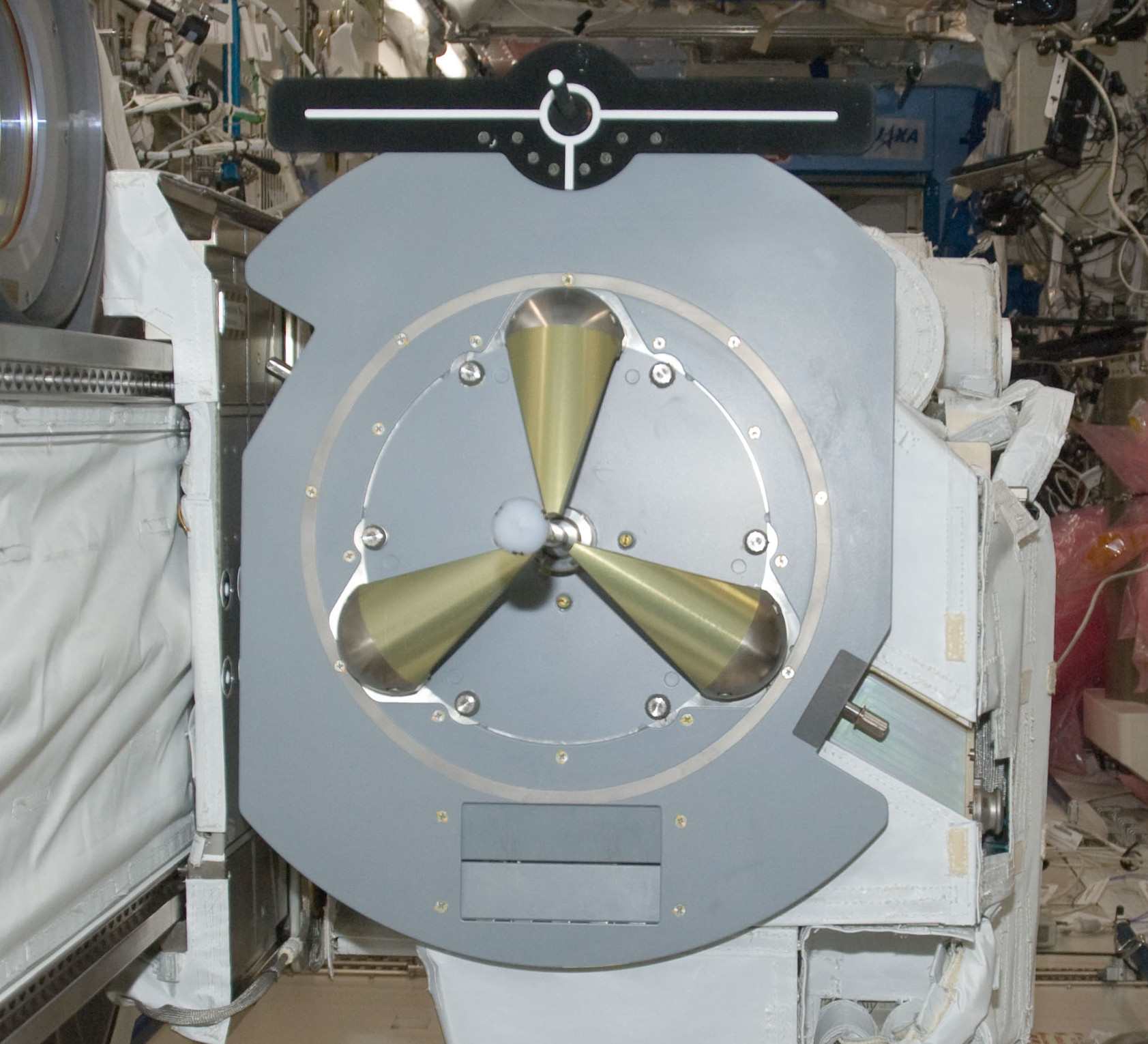
Electro Mechanical Grapple Fixture used on Kibo's Small Fine Arm

The Electrical Flight Grapple Fixture (EFGF) allows for grappling. It has a single electrical connection for data, power, and video from cameras on the manipulators. The electrical connection is compatible with the Shuttle Remote Manipulator System (also known as Canadarm1).

Kibo (ISS module) Remote Manipulator System (Japanese Experiment Module Remote Manipulator System) uses a similar grapple fixture, called Electro Mechanical Grapple Fixture (EMGF).

==== Power and Video Grapple Fixture ====
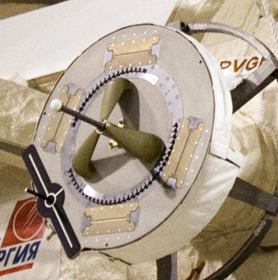
Power and Video Grapple Fixture

The Power and Video Grapple Fixture (PVGF) allows for grappling and latching. It has electrical connectors for data, video, and power. The electrical connections are compatible with the Space Station Remote Manipulator System (also known as Canadarm2).

==== Power and Data Grapple Fixture ====
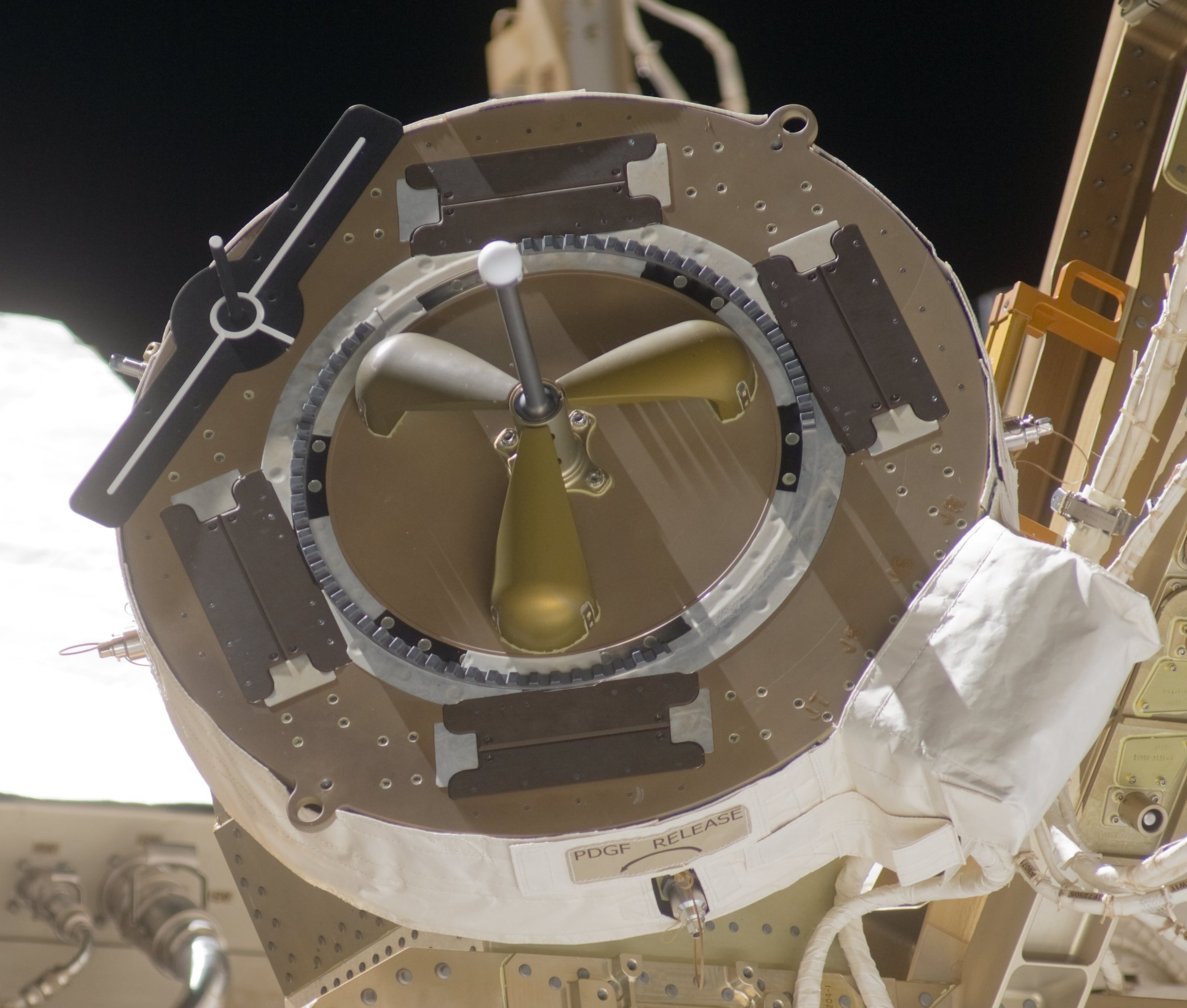
Power and Data Grapple Fixture

The Power Data Grapple Fixture (PDGF) allows for grappling and latching. It has electrical connectors for data, video, and power; it is also the only North American grapple fixture that is replaceable on-orbit. The electrical connections are compatible with the Space Station Remote Manipulator System (also known as Canadarm2).

It is used on the International Space Station (ISS). PDGFs can be "grappled" by the Canadarm2 robotic arm, in order to allow the arm to manipulate and power a grappled object, or be commanded by operators based inside the ISS. PDGFs located around much of the station provide connections for the arm. They have four rectangular connectors to transfer data, video and electrical power. During the penultimate Space Shuttle flight a PDGF was installed on the Zarya module to support Canadarm2 operations based from the Russian segment.

=== Satellites with NASA grapple fixtures ===
- Hubble Space Telescope has two fixtures
- Long Duration Exposure Facility (LDEF) had two. An FRGF and an active (rigidize sensing) grapple used to send an electronic signal to initiate the 19 experiments that had electrical systems.
- Solar Maximum Mission had one - used by Shuttle for repair in orbit
- Nancy Grace Roman Space Telescope One fixture designed to facilitate possible future servicing missions.

== European grapple fixture ==
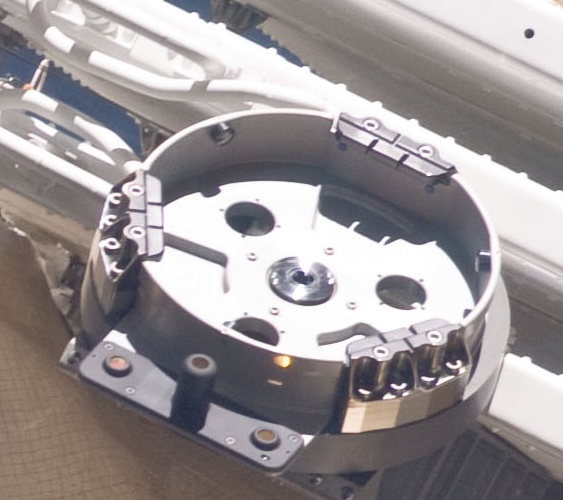
A grapple fixture used by the European Robotic Arm, located on the Rassvet Mini-Research Module 1 (MRM1) of the International Space Station. This fixture, along with others allows for the European Robotic Arm to grapple and move around the station.

Although the European Robotic Arm uses grapples to relocate in a similar fashion to Canadarm2, the grapple fixtures are not compatible with each other. This means the European arm can only work on the Russian segments of the station.

- May 2020 - Shipped to Baikonur for final processing
- July 2021 - Launched with the Russian Multipurpose Laboratory Module
