= STS-123 =

2008 American crewed spaceflight to the ISS

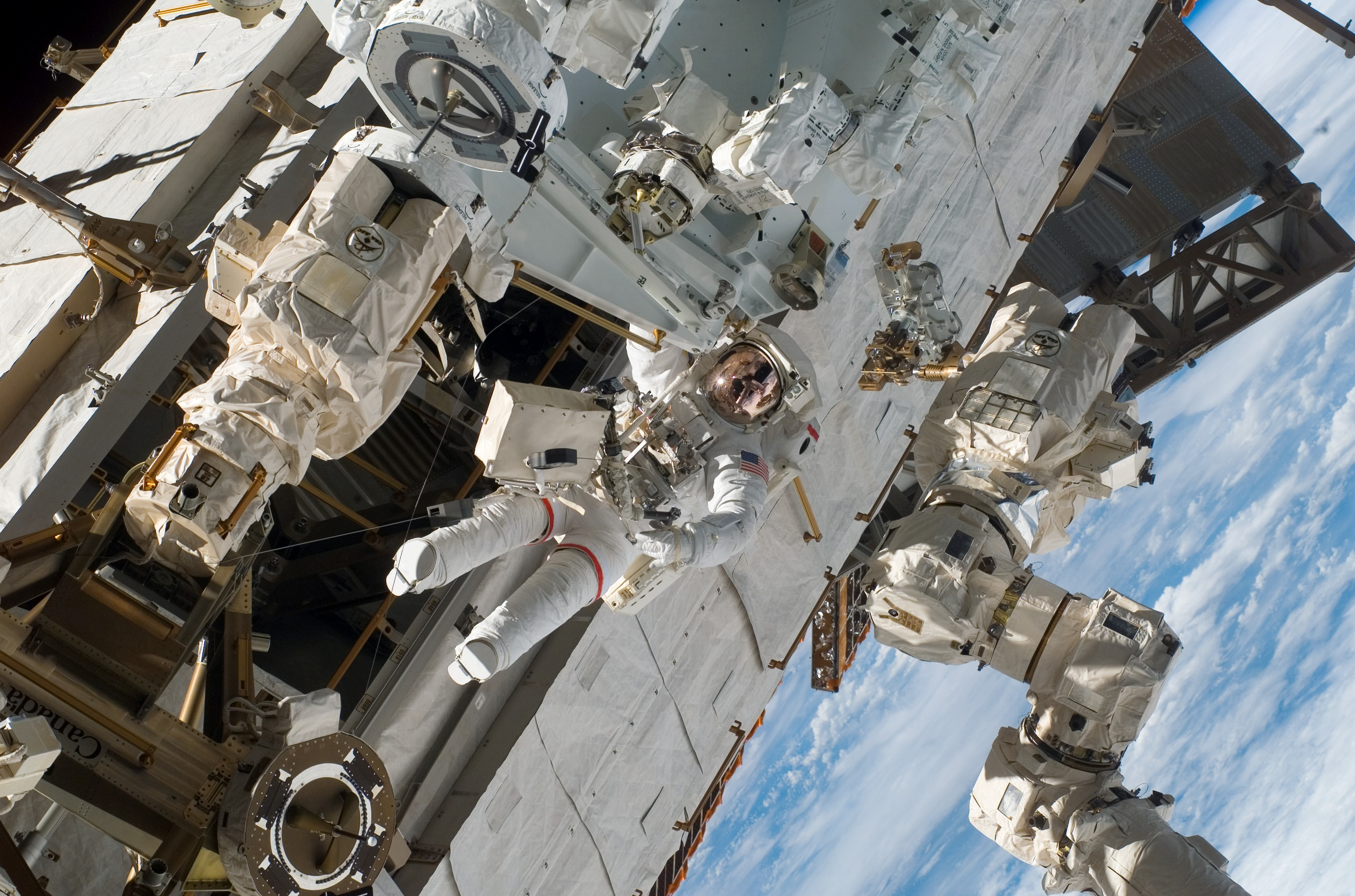
- Linnehan assisting in the installation of Dextre on the ISS, during the mission's first EVA
- Names: Space Transportation System-123
- Mission type: ISS assembly
- Operator: NASA
- COSPAR ID: 2008-009A
- SATCAT no.: 32699
- Mission duration: 15 days, 18 hours, 12 minutes, 27 seconds
- Distance travelled: 10,585,900 kilometres (6,577,800 mi)
- Orbits completed: 250

Spacecraft properties
- Spacecraft: Space Shuttle Endeavour
- Launch mass: 122,364 kilograms (269,767 lb)
- Landing mass: 94,158 kilograms (207,582 lb)

Crew
- Crew size: 7
- Members: Dominic L. Pudwill Gorie; Gregory H. Johnson; Robert L. Behnken; Michael Foreman; Richard M. Linnehan; Takao Doi
- Launching: Garrett Reisman
- Landing: Léopold Eyharts

Start of mission
- Launch date: March 11, 2008, 06:28:14 UTC
- Launch site: Kennedy, LC-39A

End of mission
- Landing date: March 27, 2008, 00:40:41 UTC
- Landing site: Kennedy, SLF Runway 15

Orbital parameters
- Reference system: Geocentric
- Regime: Low Earth
- Perigee altitude: 336 kilometers (209 mi)
- Apogee altitude: 346 kilometers (215 mi)
- Inclination: 51.6 degrees
- Period: 91.6 minutes

Docking with ISS
- Docking port: PMA-2 (Harmony forward)
- Docking date: March 13, 2008, 03:49 UTC
- Undocking date: March 26, 2008, 00:25 UTC
- Time docked: 11 days, 20 hours, 36 minutes
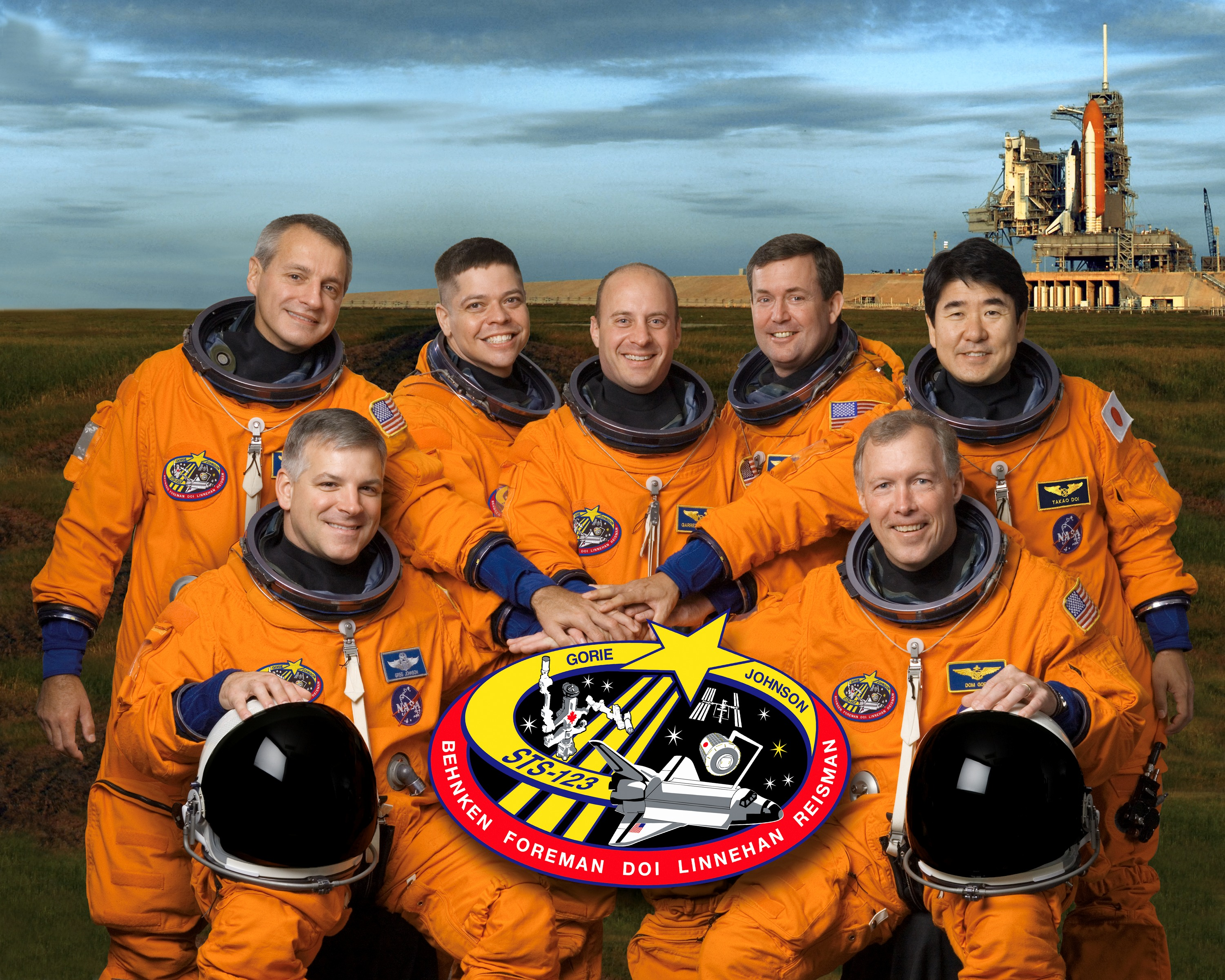
- Front row (L-R) Johnson, pilot; Gorie, commander. Back row (L-R) Linnehan, Behnken, Reisman, Foreman and Doi, mission specialists. Space Shuttle program

STS-123 was a Space Shuttle mission to the International Space Station (ISS) which was flown by Space Shuttle Endeavour. STS-123 was the 1J/A ISS assembly mission. The original launch target date was February 14, 2008, but after the delay of STS-122, the shuttle was launched on March 11, 2008. It was the twenty-fifth shuttle mission to visit the ISS, and delivered the first module of the Japanese laboratory, Japanese Experiment Module (Kibō), and the Canadian Special Purpose Dexterous Manipulator, (SPDM) Dextre robotics system to the station. The mission duration was 15 days and 18 hours, and it was the first mission to fully utilize the Station-to-Shuttle Power Transfer System (SSPTS), allowing space station power to augment the shuttle power systems. The mission set a record for a shuttle's longest stay at the ISS.

== Crew ==
Position	Launching Astronaut	Landing Astronaut
Commander	(United States) Dominic L. Pudwill Gorie; Fourth and last spaceflight	
Pilot	(United States) Gregory H. Johnson; First spaceflight	
Mission Specialist 1	(United States) Robert L. Behnken; First spaceflight	
Mission Specialist 2 Flight Engineer	(United States) Michael Foreman; First spaceflight	
Mission Specialist 3	(United States) Richard M. Linnehan; Fourth and last spaceflight	
Mission Specialist 4	(Japan) Takao Doi, JAXA; Second and last spaceflight	
Mission Specialist 5	(United States) Garrett Reisman; Expedition 16; First spaceflight ISS Flight Engineer	(France) Léopold Eyharts, ESA; Expedition 16; Second and last spaceflight ISS Flight Engineer

== Mission payloads ==
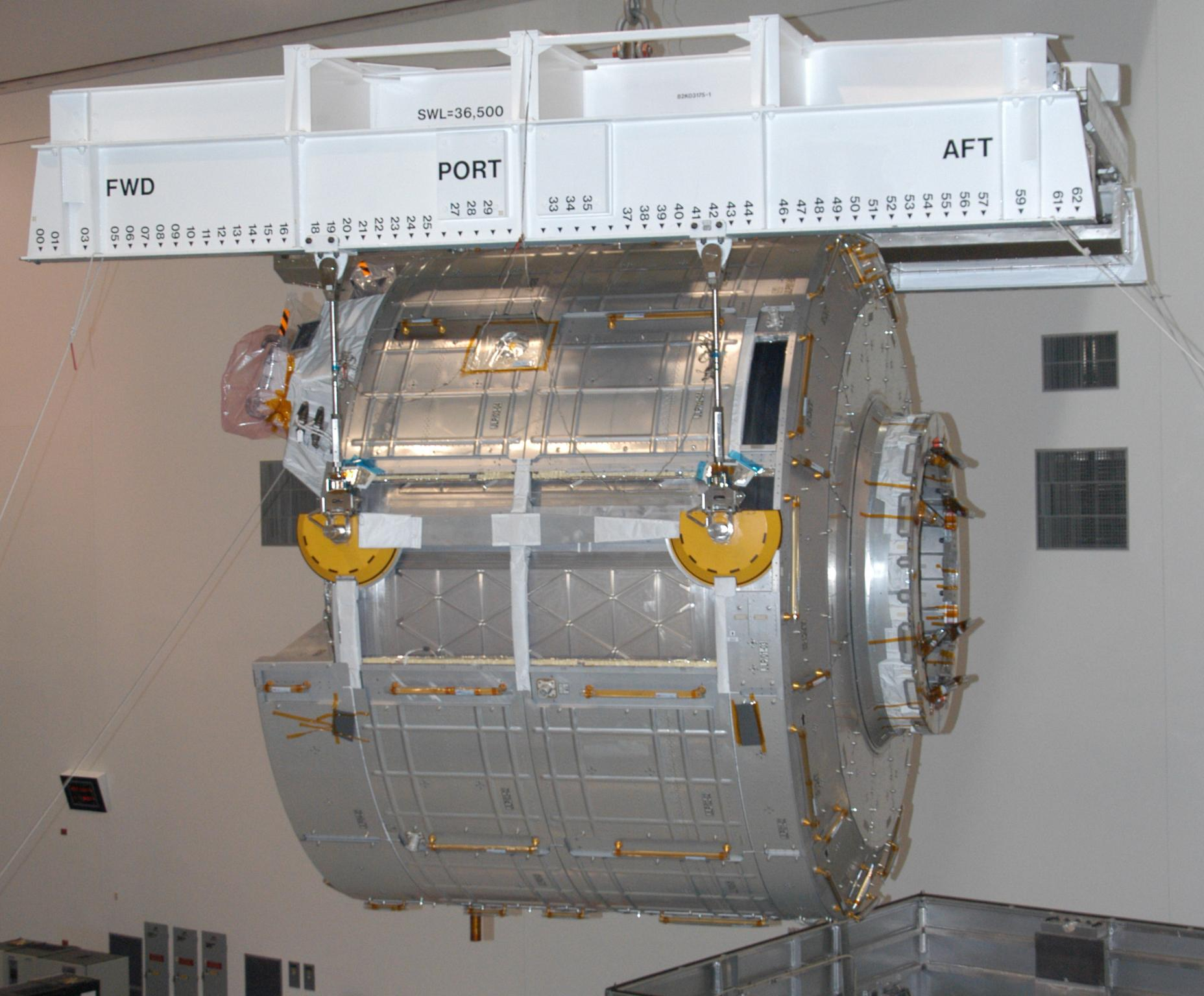
JEM Kibo ELM-PS in the Space Station Processing Facility

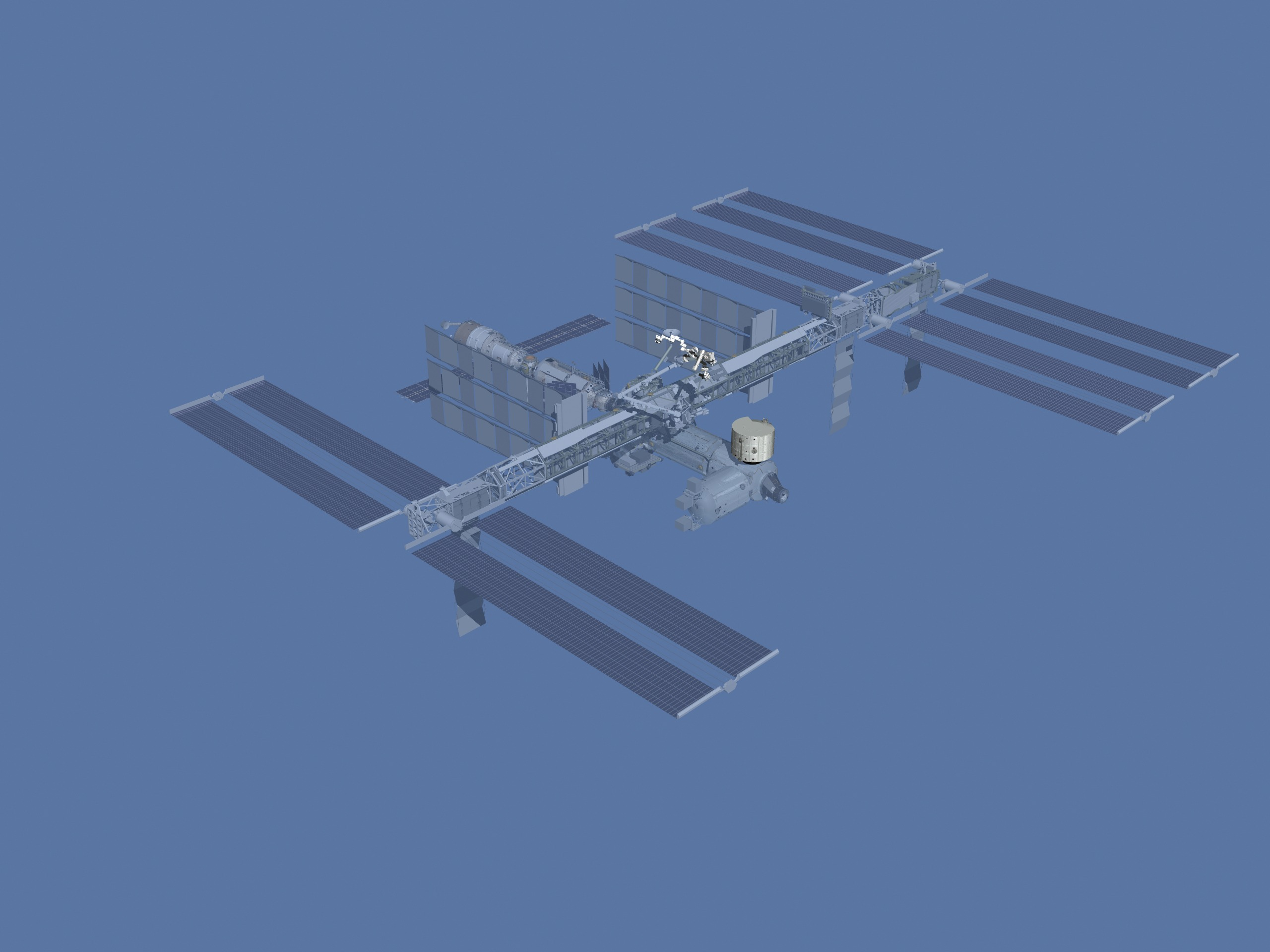
JEM Kibo ELM-PS and DEXTR on ISS after STS-123

Location	Cargo	Mass
Bay 1–2	Orbiter Docking System; EMU 3003 / EMU 3004	1,800 kilograms (4,000 lb); ~260 kilograms (570 lb)
Bay 3P	Shuttle Power; Distribution Unit (SPDU)	~100 kilograms (220 lb)
Bay 3S	Canadarm2 Yaw Joint	336 kilograms (741 lb)
Bay 4P	MISSE PEC 6a	103 kilograms (227 lb)
Bay 4S	Direct Current Switching Unit (DCSU)	363 kilograms (800 lb)
Bay 5P	MISSE PEC 6b	103 kilograms (227 lb)
Bay 5S	Direct Current Switching Unit (DCSU)	363 kilograms (800 lb)
Bay 6S	Standard Interface Panels	?
Bay 7–8	Dextre on Spacelab Pallet	3,485 kilograms (7,683 lb)
Bay 9P	ECSH (EVA Cargo Stowage) on APC	~100 kilograms (220 lb)
Bay 10–12	Kibō ELM-PS	8,484 kilograms (18,704 lb)
Bay 11S	Standard Interface Panels	?
Bay 13P	Lightweight adapter plane for MISSE	244 kilograms (538 lb)
Bay 13S	USAF RIGEX experiment	315 kilograms (694 lb)
Starboard Sill	Orbiter Boom Sensor System	~450 kilograms (990 lb)
Port Sill	Canadarm	410 kilograms (900 lb)
	Total:	16,916 kilograms (37,293 lb)

STS-123 delivered the pressurized section of the Japanese Experiment Logistics Module (ELM-PS) as well as the Special Purpose Dexterous Manipulator (SPDM) to the International Space Station. The SPDM was delivered disassembled on a Spacelab Pallet (SLP) and assembled during three spacewalks once it was at the station.

== Shuttle processing ==
In August 2007, STS-123 crew members participated in crew equipment interface tests for the ELM-PS at Kennedy Space Center. Processing continued on schedule for Endeavour's launch in early 2008. NASA engineers applied the same ECO sensor modifications used on STS-122's external tank, to Endeavour's tank. In January, a HEPA filter contamination issue was discovered, but was resolved and with no impact to the mission.

On February 11, 2008, Endeavour was "rolled over" to the Vehicle Assembly Building in preparation for mating with the external tank and solid rocket boosters. On February 13, 2008, Endeavour was successfully mated with its external tank and solid rocket boosters, and was rolled out to Launch Pad 39A in the early hours of February 18, 2008, for its planned launch on March 11, 2008. The Terminal Countdown Demonstration Test, a full dress rehearsal for launch with the crew, took place February 23–25, 2008.

=== Crew seat assignments ===
Seat	Launch	Landing	Seats 1–4 are on the flight deck. Seats 5–7 are on the mid-deck.
1	Gorie		Seats 1–4 are on the flight deck. Seats 5–7 are on the mid-deck.
2	Johnson		Seats 1–4 are on the flight deck. Seats 5–7 are on the mid-deck.
3	Behnken		Seats 1–4 are on the flight deck. Seats 5–7 are on the mid-deck.
4	Foreman		Seats 1–4 are on the flight deck. Seats 5–7 are on the mid-deck.
5	Linnehan		Seats 1–4 are on the flight deck. Seats 5–7 are on the mid-deck.
6	Doi		Seats 1–4 are on the flight deck. Seats 5–7 are on the mid-deck.
7	Reisman	Eyharts	Seats 1–4 are on the flight deck. Seats 5–7 are on the mid-deck.

== Mission background ==
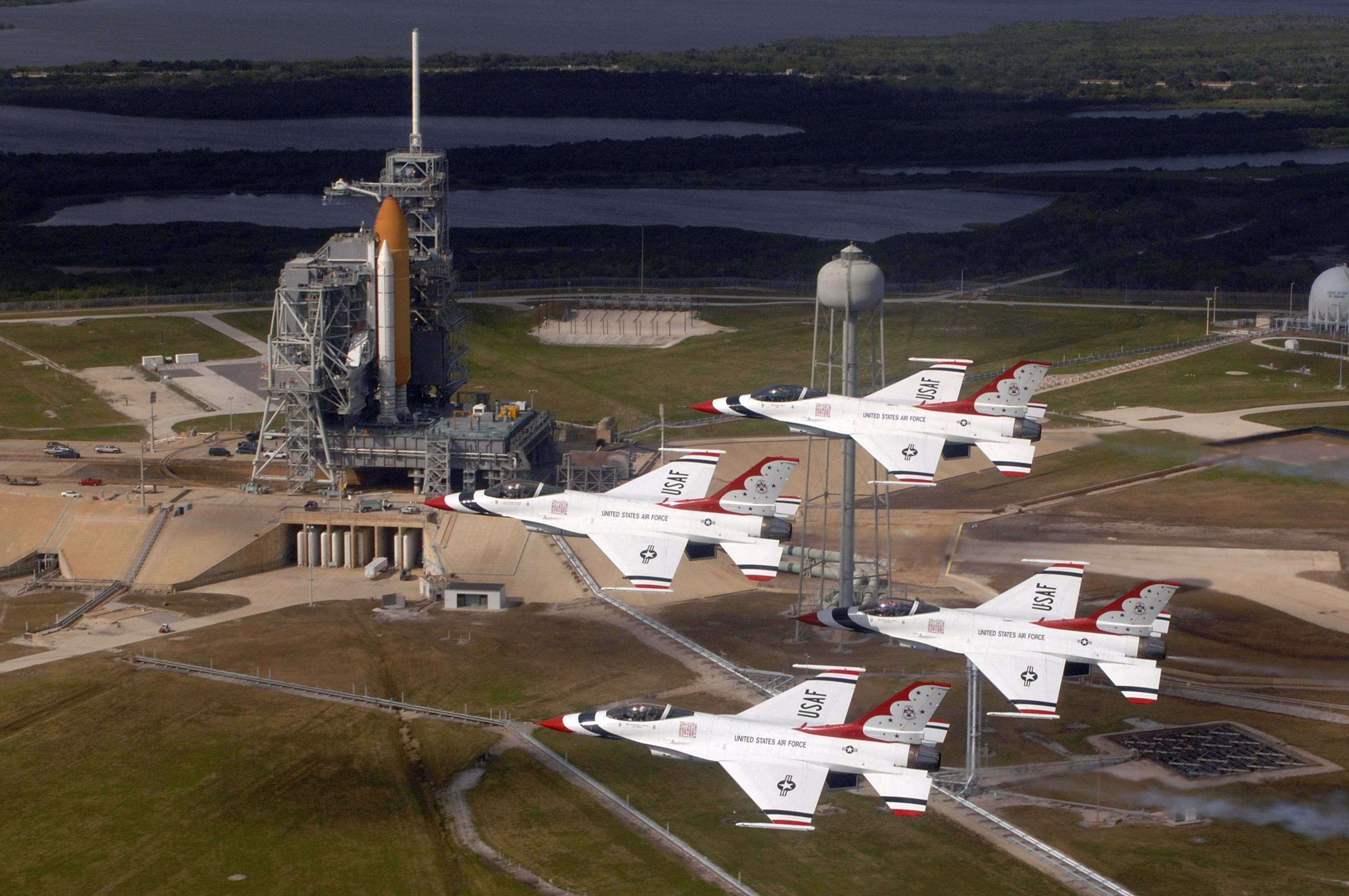
The USAF Thunderbirds display team performs a flypast of the STS-123 stack, in commemoration of NASA's 50th anniversary.

The mission marked:

- Longest shuttle mission to the ISS to date
- 153rd NASA crewed spaceflight
- 122nd Space Shuttle flight since STS-1
- 97th post-Challenger mission
- 9th post-Columbia mission
- 30th Night Launch
- 16th KSC Shuttle Night Landing, 22nd Shuttle Night Landing Overall
- 21st launch of Endeavour
- 2nd mission of Endeavour since Return to Flight

== Mission timeline ==
Flight days are based on the days as experienced by the astronauts, who are generally in a day-and-night pattern that is not equal to that of the launch site. The first flight day is the day of launch for the astronauts. That day started at the launch site on March 10, 2008 (local time), with the actual launch in the early hours of the 11th and the astronauts going to bed several hours after launch. March 10, 2008, is called flight day 1 by NASA, even though the actual mission launched on March 11.

=== March 11 (Flight day 1, Launch) ===
Endeavour launched on time at 02:28:14 EDT (06:28:14 UTC) early into the night of March 11, 2008, from Launch Complex 39A at the Kennedy Space Center.

The Flash Evaporator System switched from its primary controller to the backup controller during launch, and instrumentation for a few left-side control thrusters was lost due to a card failure. These anomalies were not expected to affect the mission.

=== March 12 (Flight day 2) ===
The shuttle closed in on the space station. The crew used a 50 ft (15 m) laser-tipped boom to inspect its wings and nose for any sign of launch damage. The inspection has been standard procedure ever since the 2003 Columbia disaster. Flight director Mike Moses said a quick look at the images the astronauts beamed down to Earth revealed no signs of trouble.

In addition to performing the inspection, the astronauts also prepared their spacesuits for the five planned spacewalks and gathered the tools they would need for the docking.

=== March 13 (Flight day 3) ===
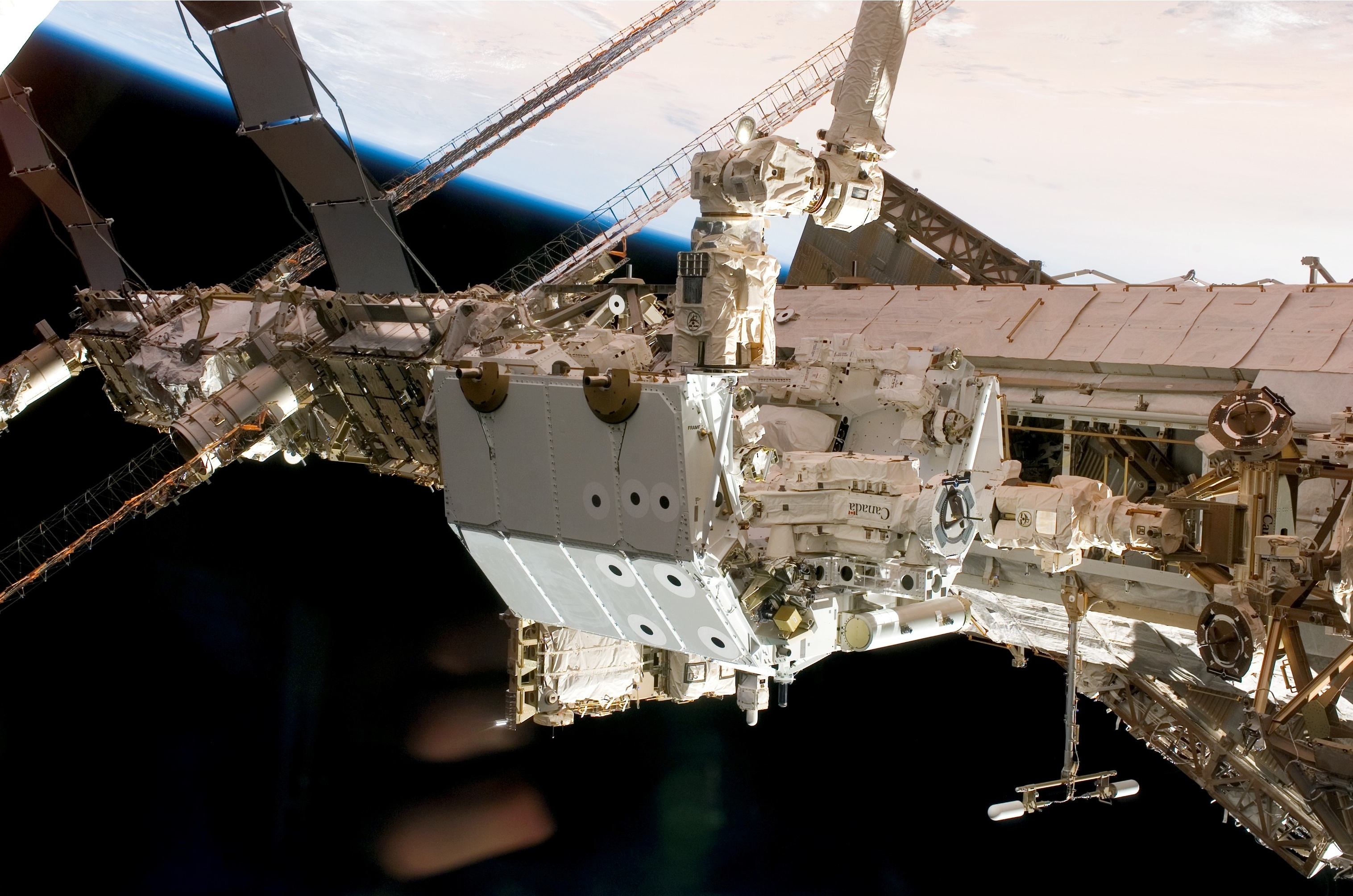
The pallet with Dextre is temporarily docked to the Mobile Base Station.

Endeavour's commander, Dominic Gorie, guided the shuttle through a 360-degree backflip, known as the rendezvous pitch maneuver, to allow for full photographic surveillance of the thermal tiles on the Space Shuttle's underside before docking with the space station. Docking occurred at 03:49 UTC and the hatches between the two spacecraft were opened at 05:36 UTC on. After docking the pallet carrying Dextre was moved to the Payload ORU Accommodation (POA) of the Mobile Base Station (MBS) by Canadarm2.

=== March 14 (Flight day 4) ===
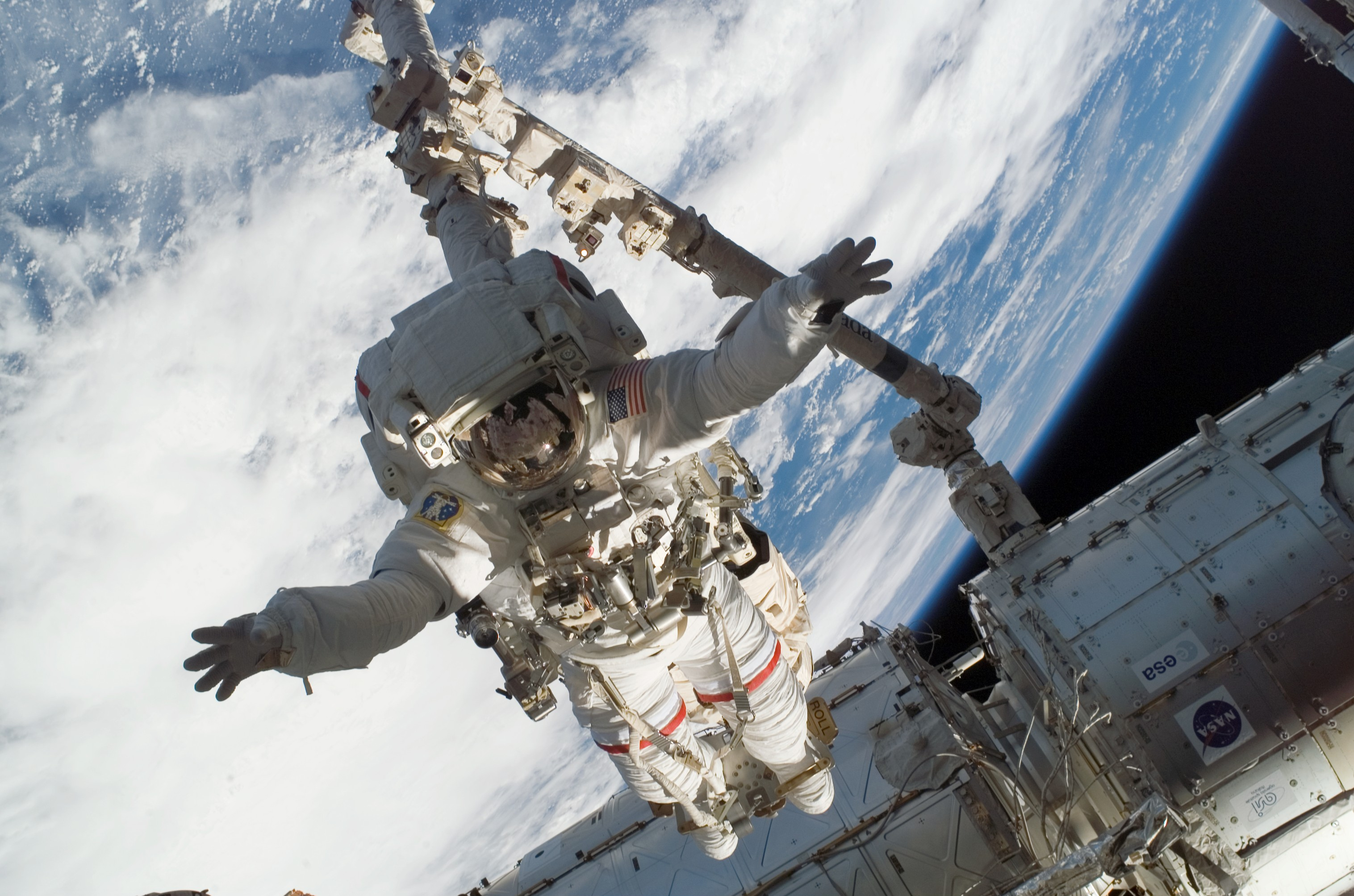
Astronaut Linnehan "flies" towards Reisman during the first EVA

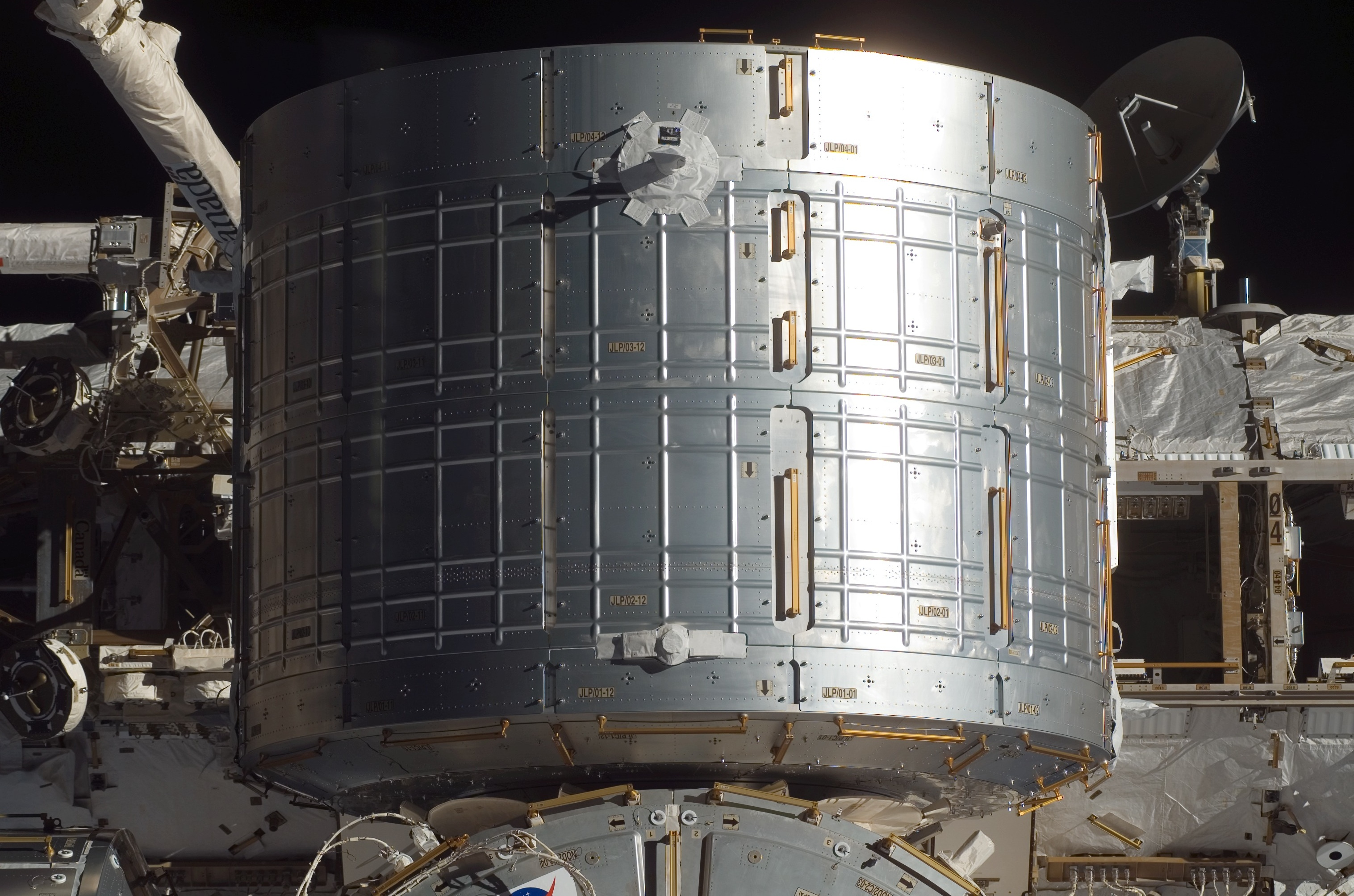
The Kibō ELM-PS as installed on Harmony

Spacewalkers Richard Linnehan and Garrett Reisman worked on installing Dextre. However, the Spacelab pallet carrying the SPDM would not power up. Engineers on the ground tried a software patch, though later suspected a design flaw in Dextre's temporary power cable caused the issue.

Crew members on board Endeavour used a robotic arm to remove the Japanese Logistics Module – Pressurized Section (JLP) from Endeavour's cargo bay and attach it to the space station. The JLP was attached to its interim location on the Harmony module at 08:06 UTC.

=== March 15 (Flight day 5) ===
The crew spent time outfitting the Japanese Logistics Module, transferring supplies and equipment into it from Space Shuttle Endeavour. The station's arm operators grappled the Canadian-built Dextre Friday at 01:59 UTC. Canadarm2 successfully powered up Dextre 11 minutes later. Mission Specialists Rick Linnehan and Mike Foreman spent the night in the station's Quest Airlock in preparation for the second spacewalk of the mission.

=== March 16 (Flight day 6) ===
Dextre was put together today during the second spacewalk of STS-123. Mission Specialists Richard Linnehan and Mike Foreman completed their 7-hour, 8-minute orbital stroll Sunday at 06:57 UTC. The spacewalkers encountered some difficulty removing two bolts that secured the robot arm during transport, and had to resort to using a prybar to remove them.

Throughout the day, the station and shuttle crew members continued outfitting the Japanese Logistics Module – Pressurized Section.

=== March 17 (Flight day 7) ===
The crews continued outfitting the Japanese Logistics Module – Pressurized Section, transferring supplies and equipment into it from Endeavour, as well as configuring racks inside the module. The crews tested the brakes in the robotic system's arms. One of the joints in the arm seemed to be operating right on the required margin. Engineers expressed confidence that this issue would be resolved

Rick Linnehan and Robert Behnken ended their day by "camping out" in the station's Quest Airlock.

=== March 18 (Flight day 8) ===
Linnehan and Behnken began the third EVA at 22:51 UTC. The excursion lasted six hours and 53 minutes. Linnehan and Behnken installed a spare parts platform, cameras, and tool handling assembly for Dextre. Among other tasks, they also checked out and calibrated Dextre's end effector and attached critical spare parts to an External Stowage Platform.

They were unable to attach a materials science experiment to the Columbus module due to issues with the attachment fitting, but anticipated another opportunity later in the mission.

=== March 19 (Flight day 9) ===
In a day highlighted by robotics activity, Dextre was attached to a power and data grapple fixture located on the U.S. laboratory Destiny. Canadarm2 grabbed the pallet that secured Dextre during its journey to the orbital outpost and returned the pallet to Space Shuttle Endeavour's payload bay for the trip back to Earth.

The station and shuttle crews also prepared hardware to be used in a shuttle tile repair test on the next spacewalk, and got some much needed off duty time.

=== March 20 (Flight day 10) ===
The crews of Space Shuttle Endeavour and the International Space Station got some off-duty time at the beginning of their 10th day in orbit. They also spoke to Japanese Prime Minister Yasuo Fukuda and participated in interviews with U.S. media.

The astronauts spent the remainder of their day configuring tools for the fourth STS-123 spacewalk and reviewing spacewalk procedures. Before going to sleep, Mission Specialists Robert L. Behnken and Mike Foreman entered the station's Quest airlock for the standard "camp out".

=== March 21 (Flight day 11) ===
Mission Specialists Robert L. Behnken and Mike Foreman completed the fourth STS-123 spacewalk at 04:28 UTC, spending six hours and 24 minutes on the excursion. The two shuttle crew members replaced a failed Remote Power Control Module — essentially a circuit breaker — on the station's truss. However, there were difficulties removing a power connector from the Z1 truss.

With Mission Specialist Rick Linnehan coordinating their activities from inside the orbiting complex, the spacewalkers also tested a repair method for damaged heat resistant tiles on the Space Shuttle. This technique used a caulk-gun-like tool named the Tile Repair Ablator Dispenser to dispense a material called Shuttle Tile Ablator-54 into purposely damaged heat shield tiles. The sample tiles will be returned to Earth to undergo extensive testing on the ground.

=== March 22 (Flight day 12) ===
The STS-123 crew performed the final inspection of Space Shuttle Endeavour's heat shield using the shuttle's robot arm and the Orbiter Boom Sensor System (OBSS). Gorie, Johnson, and Doi surveyed the orbiter's wings and nose cap to ensure that no damage had occurred to the tiles that protect Endeavour from the heat of reentry.

The crews spent the remainder of their day configuring tools and reviewing procedures for the flight's final spacewalk. This included the standard "camp out" in the station's Quest airlock for Behnken and Foreman.

=== March 23 (Flight day 13) ===
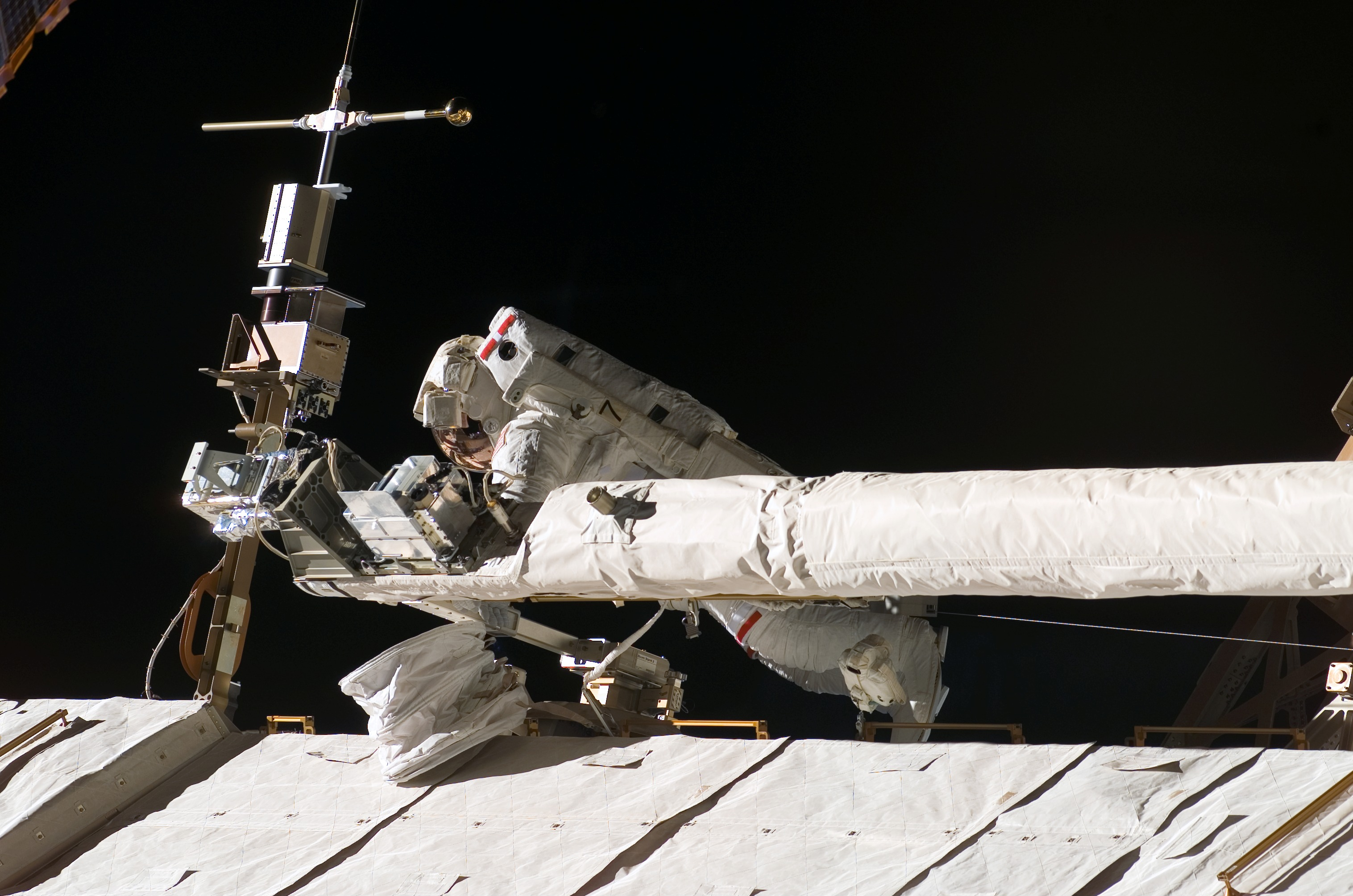
Foreman helps tie down the OBSS

Michael Foreman and Robert Behnken completed their six-hour EVA at 02:36 (UTC), attaching a 50 ft (15 m) inspection pole to the International Space Station and completing other chores. Foreman and Behnken hooked an extra-long power cord to the inspection pole, to keep its lasers and cameras warm for the next two months, then secured the boom to the outside of the space station.

After finishing that task, Foreman inspected a jammed rotating joint that has restricted the use of a set of solar wings for months. NASA hopes to have a plan for dealing with the jammed joint by the end of the month, space station flight director Dana Weigel said.

=== March 24 (Flight day 14) ===
The crews of Space Shuttle Endeavour and the International Space Station completed their last full day together.

Much of the astronauts' morning was off-duty time. Afterward, the crews wrapped up transfers of equipment and supplies between Endeavour and the station, and out the tools needed for undocking and subsequent activities.

The STS-123 and Expedition 16 crews also held a joint crew news conference, answering questions from members of the media on Earth.

=== March 25 (Flight day 15) ===
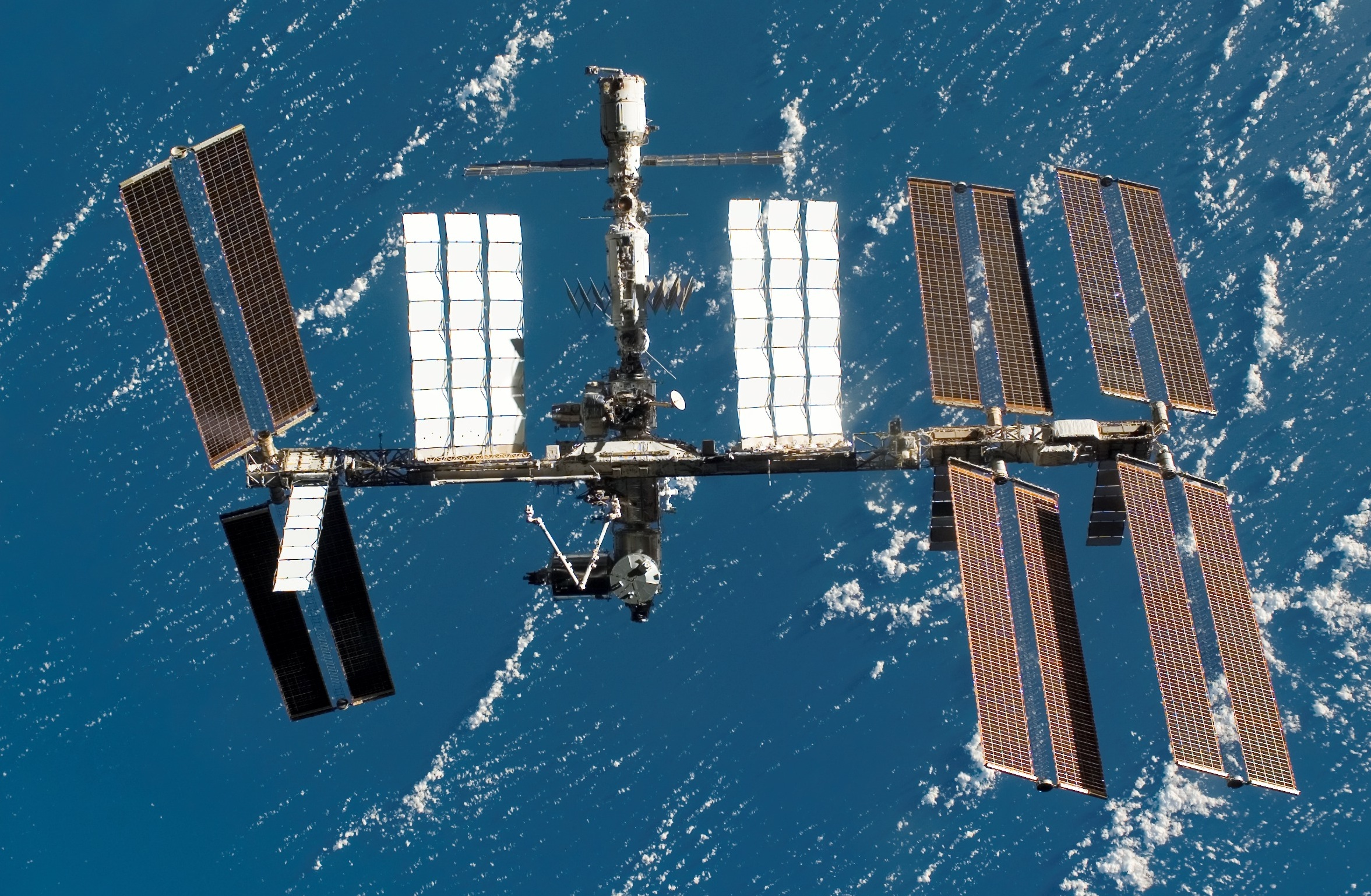
ISS as seen from the departing Space Shuttle

The hatches between Endeavour and the International Space Station closed around 21:49 UTC, ending a 12-day stay at the ISS, with a scheduled undocking of 23:57 UTC. Because of problems with a command sent to solar arrays in the ISS, the undocking was delayed 28 minutes and occurred at 00:25 UTC.

=== March 26 (Flight day 16) ===
The crew of Space Shuttle Endeavour spent Tuesday getting ready for its journey home and the end of the STS-123 mission. Early in their day, the crew members performed a test of the thrusters that will be used to position the orbiter for re-entry and the control surfaces for its flight through the atmosphere.

The STS-123 astronauts also set up the recumbent seat for Mission Specialist Léopold Eyharts, who joined the crew of Endeavour on the International Space Station. The recumbent seat is a special seat designed to reduce the stress of gravity on those who have spent long periods of time in the weightless environment of space.

=== March 27 (Flight day 17, landing) ===
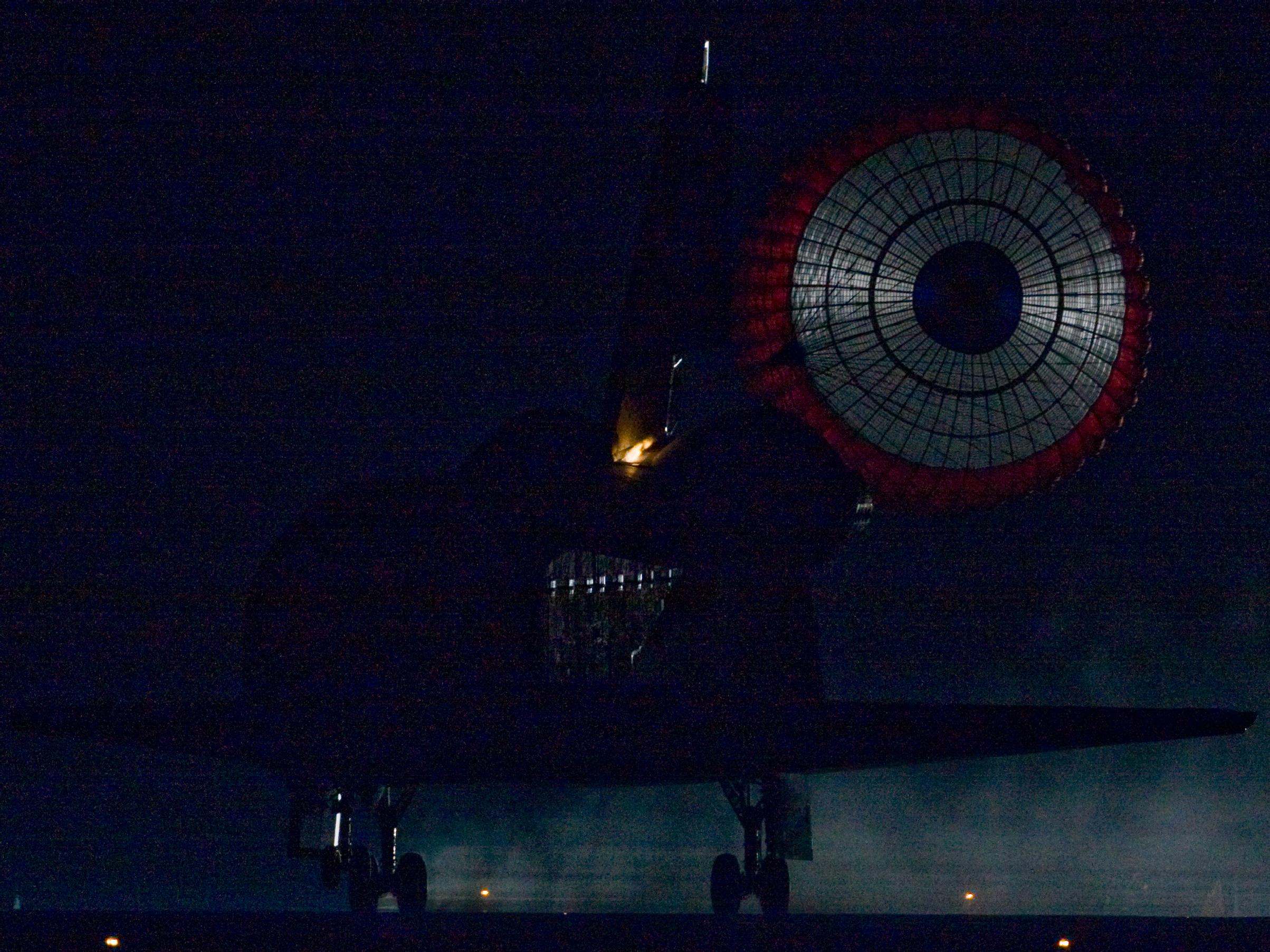
Endeavour rolls out after touchdown. The yellow flame is from the shuttle's APUs and is clearly visible in the pitch black night. Space Shuttles did not have anti collision lights, navigation lights, or landing lights

Flight controllers gave a no-go on de-orbit for the first landing opportunity at 23:05 UTC (19:05 EDT), due to unfavorable weather conditions at the Shuttle Landing Facility at Kennedy Space Center.

Weather conditions were acceptable for the second landing opportunity, planned for 00:39 UTC March 27, 2008 (20:39 EDT March 26, 2008). The landing occurred at the Shuttle Landing Facility, and was the sixteenth night landing of the Space Shuttle at KSC, 22nd Shuttle night landing overall. Coincidentally, this mission also began with a night launch.

The second landing opportunity was a complete success with main gear touchdown occurring at 20:39:08 EDT (00:39:08 UTC March 27, 2008), nose gear touchdown at 20:39:17 EDT (00:39:17 UTC March 27, 2008), and wheels stop at 20:40:41 EDT (00:40:41 UTC March 27, 2008), completing the STS-123 crew's 16 days, 14 hours, 12 minutes, 27 seconds space voyage.

The exhaust produced by the Hydrazine Gas Generator APUs on either side of Endeavour's tail fin created concern among some observers that something was amiss, as it appeared more pronounced than usual in NASA's visual light cameras. However, this exhaust is normal and expected. The three Hydrazine Gas Generator APUs are activated five minutes before the deorbit burn and are running for five minutes after wheels stop. The mono-propellant hydrazine changes phase due to a catalyst and reaches 1,700 °F (927 °C). The hydraulic power is needed for the shuttle's rudder/speed brake, elevons, body flap and landing gear during descent, and for the main engine nozzles' gimballing during ascent. Each of the Solid Rocket Boosters have two similar Hydrazine Gas Generators for their nozzle gimballing.

== Extra-vehicular activity ==
Five spacewalks took place during the flight. The cumulative time in extra-vehicular activity during the mission was 33 hours and 28 minutes.

EVA	Spacewalkers	Start (UTC)	End	Duration	Mission
EVA 1	Richard M. Linnehan; Garrett E. Reisman	March 14, 2008; 01:18	March 14, 2008; 08:19	7 hours, 01 minutes	Installation of ELM-PS and Dextre assembly.
EVA 2	Linnehan; Michael J. Foreman	March 15, 2008; 23:49	March 16, 2008; 06:57	7 hours, 08 minutes	Dextre assembly (cont.).
EVA 3	Linnehan; Robert L. Behnken	March 17, 2008; 22:51	March 18, 2008; 05:44	6 hours, 53 minutes	Dextre assembly (cont.), prepare the Spacelab Logistics Pallet for landing, transfer a spare Canadarm2 yaw join, transfer two spare Direct Current Switching Units Mission and unsuccessful attempted installation of the MISSE 6 experiment on the exterior of the Columbus module.
EVA 4	Behnken; Foreman	March 20, 2008; 22:04	March 21, 2008; 04:28	6 hours, 24 minutes	Replacement of Remote Power Control Module and test of tile repair material. Removal of a sock covering the left hand of Dextre and some launch locks on Harmony. Release launch locks on Harmony's port and nadir Common Berthing Mechanisms
EVA 5	Behnken; Foreman	March 22, 2008; 20:34	March 23, 2008; 02:36	6 hours, 02 minutes	Storage of Shuttle Orbiter Boom Sensor System on the Station, installation of ELM‐PS trunnion covers, removed five covers from the starboard SARJ and performed inspections, captured digital photography, successful installation of the MISSE 6 experiment on the exterior of the Columbus module and debris collection.

== Wake-up calls ==
NASA began a tradition of playing music to astronauts during the Gemini program, which was first used to wake up a flight crew during Apollo 15. Each track is specially chosen, often by their families, and usually has a special meaning to an individual member of the crew, or is applicable to their daily activities.

Flight Day	Song	Artist/Composer	Played for	Links
Day 2	"Linus & Lucy"	Vince Guaraldi	Michael Foreman	wav mp3 Transcript
Day 3	"Godzilla"	Blue Öyster Cult	Takao Doi	wav mp3 Transcript
Day 4	"Saturday Night"	the Bay City Rollers	Garrett Reisman	wav mp3 Transcript
Day 5	"Turn! Turn! Turn! (To Everything There is a Season)"	The Byrds	Rick Linnehan	wav mp3 Transcript
Day 6	"We're Going to be Friends"	The White Stripes	Robert L Behnken	wav mp3 Transcript
Day 7	"God of Wonders"	Caedmon's Call	Dominic Gorie	wav mp3 Transcript
Day 8	"Sharing the World"		Gregory H Johnson	wav mp3 Transcript
Day 9	"Hoshi Tsumugi no Uta"	Ayaka Hirahara	Takao Doi	wav mp3 Transcript
Day 10	"Burning Love"	Elvis Presley	Mike Foreman	wav mp3 Transcript
Day 11	"Blue Sky"	Big Head Todd and the Monsters	Rick Linnehan	wav mp3 Transcript
Day 12	"Enter Sandman"	Metallica	Robert L Behnken	wav mp3 Transcript
Day 13	"I Loved Her First"	Heartland	Dominic Gorie	wav mp3 Transcript
Day 14	"I Am Free"	Friendswood United Methodist Church	Mike Foreman	wav mp3 Transcript
Day 15	"Home"	Yuko Doi	Takao Doi	wav mp3 Transcript
Day 16	"Con Te Partiro"	Andrea Bocelli	Léopold Eyharts	wav mp3 Transcript
Day 17	"Drops of Jupiter"	Train	Gregory H Johnson	wav mp3 Transcript

== Contingency mission ==
STS-324 was the designation given to the Contingency Shuttle Crew Support mission which would have been launched in the event Space Shuttle Endeavour became disabled during STS-123. It would have been a modified version of the STS-124 mission and would have involved the launch date being brought forward. The crew for this mission would have been a four-person subset of the full STS-124 crew.

== Media ==
Space Shuttle Endeavour launches from launch pad 39A at Kennedy Space Center as part of the STS-123 mission
