= Richard M. Linnehan =

American astronaut and Army veterinarian (born 1957)

Richard Linnehan
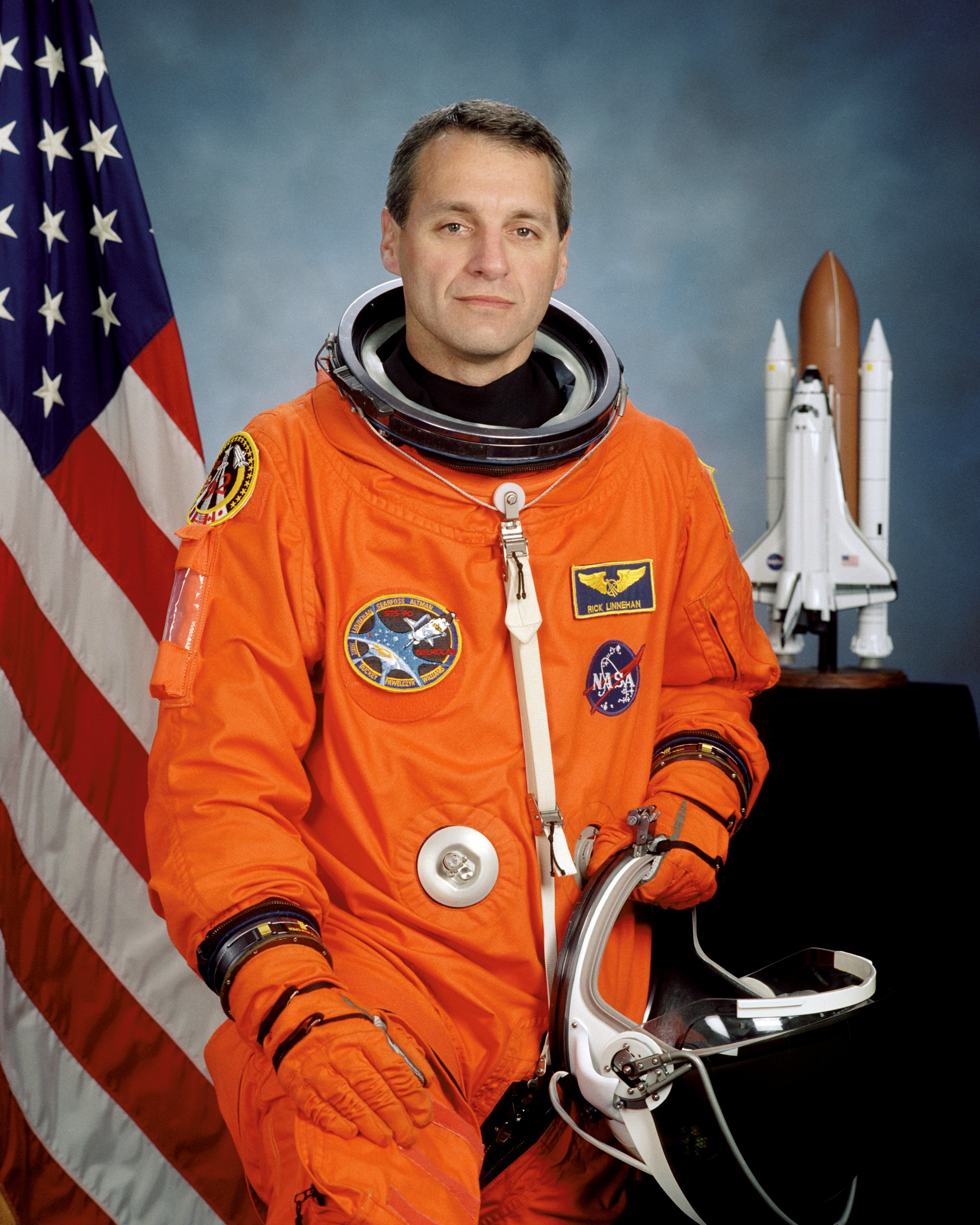
- Born: Richard Michael Linnehan; September 19, 1957 (age 69); Lowell, Massachusetts, U.S.
- Education: University of New Hampshire (BS); Ohio State University (DVM); Harvard University (MPA)
- Awards: NASA Distinguished Service Medal
- Space career

NASA astronaut
- Rank: Captain, USA
- Time in space: 59d 20h 49m
- Selection: NASA Group 14 (1992)
- Total EVAs: 6
- Total EVA time: 42h 11m
- Missions: STS-78; STS-90; STS-109; STS-123
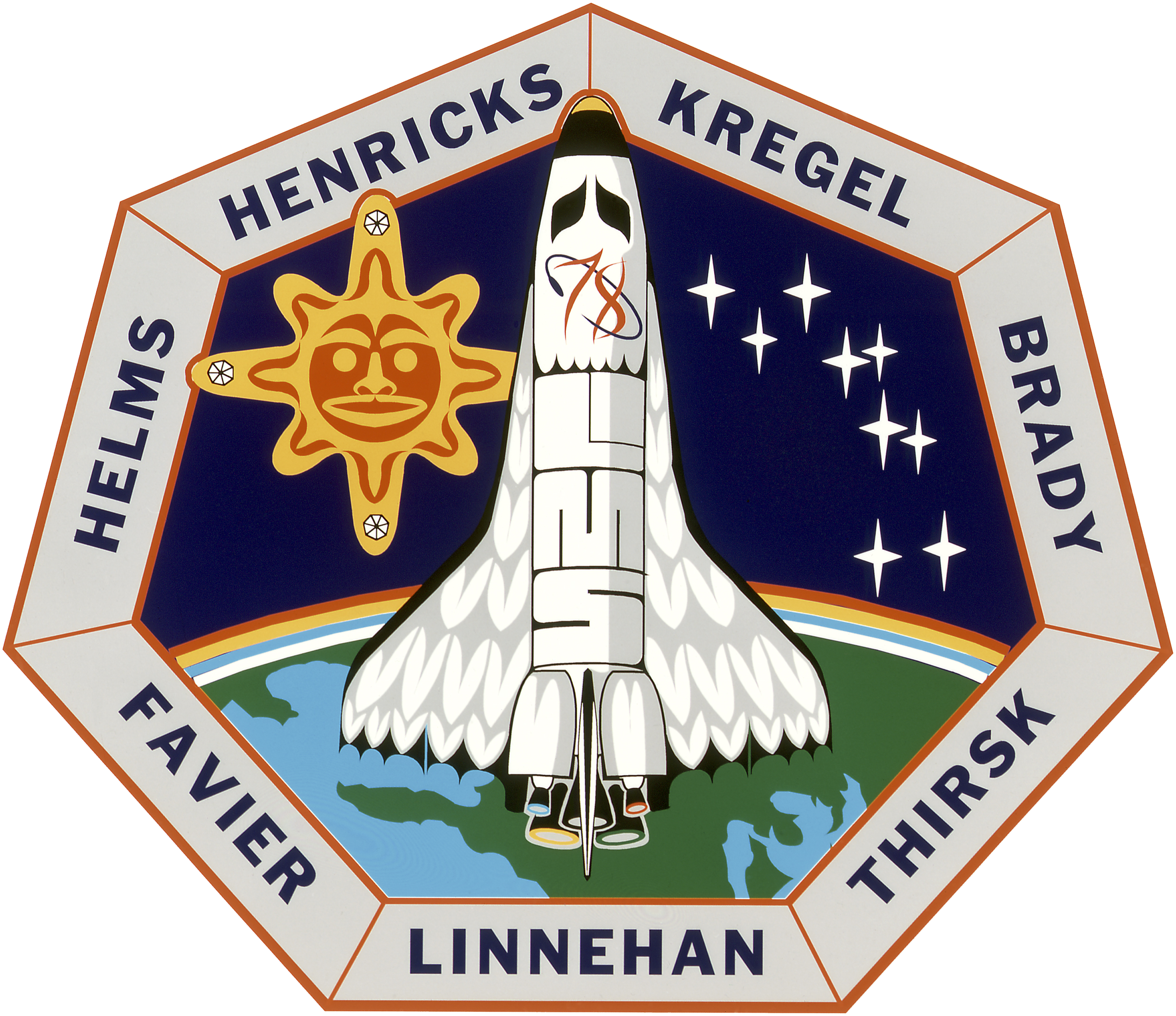
- Mission insignia
- Retired: December 2025

Richard Michael Linnehan (born September 19, 1957) is a United States Army veterinarian and a former NASA astronaut.

== Personal ==
Linnehan was born September 19, 1957, in Lowell, Massachusetts, and was raised by his paternal grandparents, William Starkey McDade and Ann Kingsley Linnehan McDade. He grew up in the state of New Hampshire. He is single and enjoys various sports, outdoor activities and natural history.

== Education ==
- 1971–1974: Attended Alvirne High School, Hudson, New Hampshire
- 1975: Graduated from Pelham High School, Pelham, New Hampshire
- 1980: Graduated from the University of New Hampshire with a Bachelor of Science degree in Animal Sciences and a minor in Microbiology
- 1985: Received the degree of Doctor of Veterinary Medicine from The Ohio State University College of Veterinary Medicine
- 1988: Completed two-year internship in exotic animal medicine and comparative pathology at the Baltimore Zoo and the Johns Hopkins University
- 2009: Received the Master of Public Administration degree from Harvard Kennedy School at Harvard University

== Organizations ==
- American Association of Zoo Veterinarians
- International Association of Aquatic Animal Medicine
- Association of Space Explorers
- Adjunct Professor at the North Carolina State University College of Veterinary Medicine in Raleigh, North Carolina
- Board member, Channel Islands Marine and Wildlife Institute ]

== Awards and honors ==
- Navy Group Achievement Award (1991)
- Navy Commendation Medal (1992)
- NASA Space Flight Medals (1996, 1998, 2002, 2008)
- The American Veterinary Medical Associations President's Award
- The University of New Hampshire Distinguished Alumni Award (1999)
- NASA Outstanding Leadership Medal (1999)
- The Ohio State University College of Veterinary Medicine Alumni Society President's Award (2002) and Distinguished Alumni Award (2002)
- NASA Exceptional Service Medal (2003)
- NASA Distinguished Service Medal (2009)
- Honorary PhDs, Suffolk University, the University of New Hampshire and Ball State University

== Career ==
After graduating from Ohio State University College of Veterinary Medicine in June 1985, Linnehan entered private veterinary practice and was later accepted to a two-year joint internship in zoo animal medicine and comparative pathology at the Baltimore Zoo and Johns Hopkins University. After completing his internship, Linnehan was commissioned as a captain in the U.S. Army Veterinary Corps and reported for duty in early 1989 at the Naval Ocean Systems Center, San Diego, California, as chief clinical veterinarian for the U.S. Navy’s Marine Mammal Program. During his assignment at the Naval Ocean Systems Center, Linnehan initiated and supervised research in the areas of cetacean and pinniped anesthesia, orthopedics, drug pharmacokinetics and reproduction in direct support of U.S. Navy mobile marine mammal systems stationed in California, Florida, and Hawaii.

== NASA career ==
Selected by NASA in March 1992, Linnehan reported to the Johnson Space Center in August 1992 where he completed one year of astronaut candidate training, qualifying him for Space Shuttle flight assignments as a mission specialist. Linnehan was initially assigned to flight software verification in the Shuttle Avionics Integration Laboratory (SAIL). He was subsequently assigned to the Astronaut Office Mission Development Branch, working on payload development, and mission development flight support for future Space Shuttle missions. He first flew as a mission specialist in 1996 on STS-78, the Life Sciences and Microgravity Spacelab (LMS) mission. In 1998, he served as the payload commander on the STS-90 Neurolab mission. In 2002, he was a member of the four-man EVA crew on STS-109 the fourth Hubble Space Telescope servicing mission. In 2008, he was the lead spacewalker on [(STS-123)] 1JA, an ISS assembly mission where he performed three EVAs and supervised the remaining two during the installation of the JEM module and Canadian SPDM. A veteran of four space flights, Linnehan has logged over 59 days in space, including six EVAs (spacewalks) totaling 42 hours and 11 minutes.

Linnehan later served as a management astronaut, making him no longer eligible for NASA spaceflight assignments. Dr. Linnehan split his time between the Astronaut Office Exploration and Integration branches and the NASA Institutional Review Board (IRB) and JSC Institutional, and NASA Flight, Animal Care and Use Committees (IACUCs).

== Spaceflight experience ==
STS-78 LMS (June 20 to July 7, 1996). The Life Sciences and Microgravity Spacelab mission was flown aboard Space Shuttle Columbia. The 17-day flight included studies sponsored by ten nations and five space agencies, and was the first mission to combine both a full microgravity studies agenda and a comprehensive life sciences payload. STS-78 orbited the Earth 271 times, and covered 7,000,000 miles (11,000,000 km) in 405 hours and 48 minutes.

STS-90 Neurolab (April 17 to May 3, 1998) was Linnehan's second Spacelab mission. During the 16-day flight the seven-person crew aboard Space Shuttle Columbia served as both experimental subjects and operators for 26 individual life science experiments focusing on the effects of microgravity on the brain and nervous system. STS-90 orbited the Earth 256 times, and covered 6,300,000 miles (10,100,000 km) in 381 hours and 50 minutes. Both missions served as a model for future life sciences studies on board the International Space Station.

STS-109 HST Servicing Mission 3B (March 1 to March 12, 2002) was the fourth Hubble Space Telescope (HST) servicing mission and Linnehan's third flight aboard Columbia. The crew of STS-109 successfully upgraded the Hubble Space Telescope's systems over the course of five consecutive EVAs, leaving it with a new power control unit, improved solar arrays, the new Advanced Camera for Surveys (ACS), and an experimental refrigeration unit for cooling the dormant Near Infrared Camera and Multi-Object Spectrometer (NICMOS). With his teammate John Grunsfeld, Linnehan performed three of the five spacewalks totaling 21 hours and 9 minutes. STS-109 orbited the Earth 165 times and covered 3,900,000 miles (6,300,000 km) in just over 262 hours.

STS-123 (March 11 to March 26, 2008) was Linnehan's fourth spaceflight, and his first aboard the Space Shuttle Endeavour. The mission delivered the Japanese Logistics Module and the Canadian Special Purpose Dexterous Manipulator to the International Space Station. Linnehan performed three of the five scheduled spacewalks on STS-123 with Garrett Reisman, Mike Foreman and Bob Behnken.
