= Wilbur H. Tousley =

19th century American politician

Member of the Wisconsin State Assembly from the Jefferson 3rd district
- In office January 3, 1870 – January 2, 1871
- Preceded by: Joseph Winslow
- Succeeded by: Nelson Fryer

Personal details
- Born: March 19, 1841 Wadsworth, Ohio, U.S.
- Died: December 9, 1903 (aged 62) Chicago, Illinois, U.S.
- Resting place: Oak Woods Cemetery, Chicago
- Party: Democratic
- Spouse: Jane Augusta Weed (m. 1861)
- Children: Miron J. Tousley^{(b. 1863; died 1865)}; Bertha E. Tousley^{(b. 1867; died 1869)}; Edward Clair Tousley^{(b. 1872; died 1923)}
- Occupation: Newspaper printer, editor

Military service
- Allegiance: United States
- Branch/service: United States Volunteers; Union Army
- Rank: 1st Lieutenant, USV
- Unit: 69th Reg. Ill. Vol. Infantry

Wilbur Hervey Tousley (March 19, 1841 – December 8, 1903) was an American newspaper editor, printer, Democratic politician, and Wisconsin pioneer. He was a member of the Wisconsin State Assembly, representing southern Jefferson County during the 1870 term.

== Biography ==
Born in Wadsworth, Ohio, Tousley moved to Wisconsin in 1858 and then moved to Illinois in 1859. In 1860, he moved back to Wisconsin and then in 1861 moved back to Illinois. During the American Civil War, Tousley enlisted in the 69th Illinois Infantry Regiment. He settled in Jefferson, Wisconsin, and was the editor and publisher of the Jefferson Banner newspaper. In 1870, Tousley served in the Wisconsin State Assembly and was a Democrat. In 1879, Tousley moved to Chicago, Illinois; he died in Chicago, Illinois in 1903.

== Notes ==
Wisconsin State Assembly
Preceded by Joseph Winslow	Member of the Wisconsin State Assembly from the Jefferson 3rd district January 3, 1870 – January 2, 1871	Succeeded by Nelson Fryer
