= Gregory H. Johnson =

American astronaut (born 1962)

Gregory Johnson
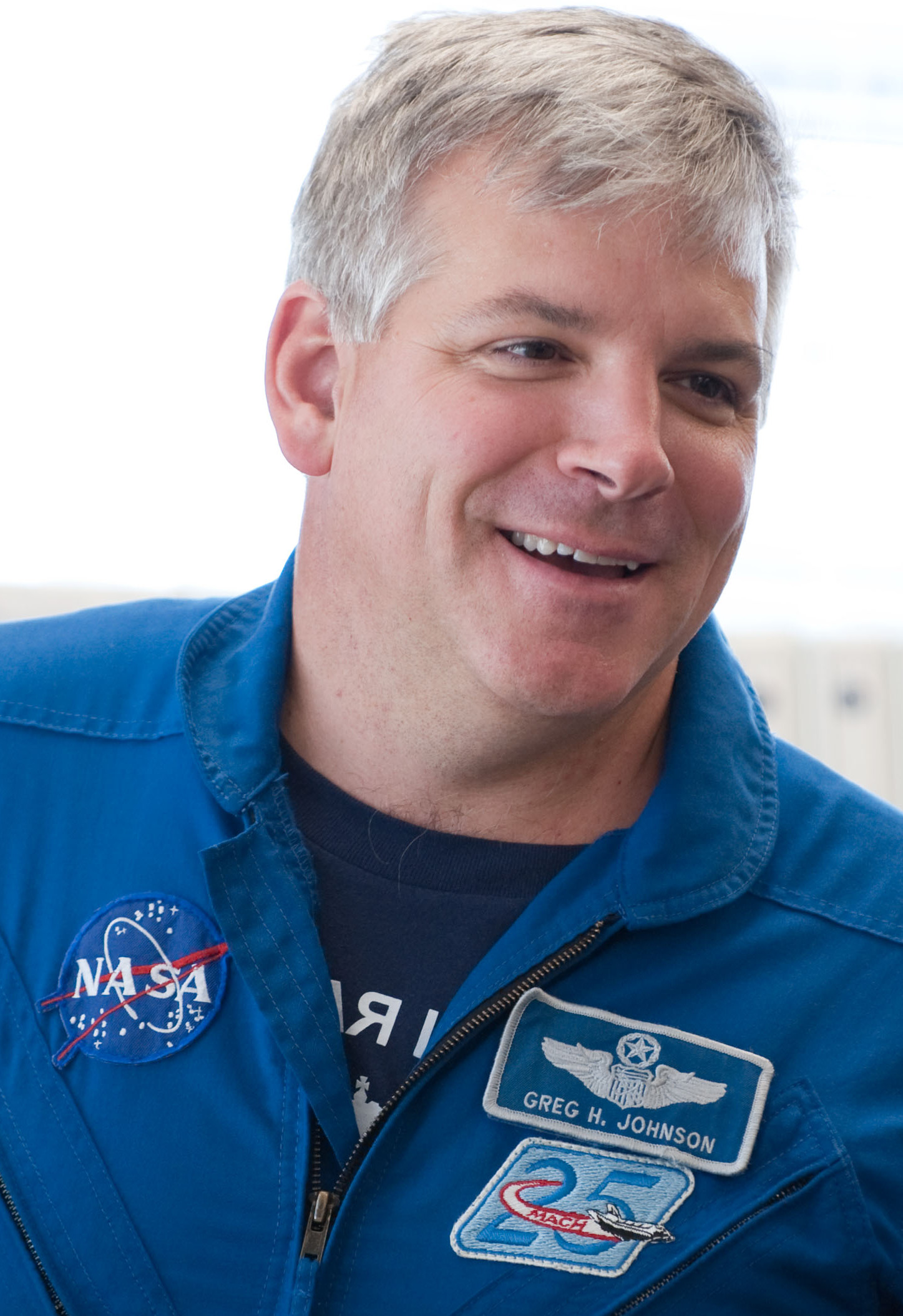
- Johnson at Ellington Field in Houston, Texas in 2010
- Born: Gregory Harold Johnson; May 12, 1962 (age 64); Ruislip, England, UK
- Other name: Box
- Education: United States Air Force Academy (BS); Columbia University (MS); University of Texas, Austin (MBA)
- Space career

NASA astronaut
- Rank: Colonel, USAF
- Time in space: 31d 11h 50m
- Selection: NASA Group 17 (1998)
- Missions: STS-123; STS-134
- Mission insignia

Gregory Harold "Box" Johnson (born May 12, 1962) is a former NASA astronaut and a retired colonel in the United States Air Force. Johnson is a veteran of two space flights, STS-123 and STS-134. He served as pilot on his first mission, which delivered the Kibo logistics module and the Dextre robot arm to the International Space Station. Johnson was also assigned as the pilot to the STS-134 mission, which launched on May 16, 2011, and landed on June 1, 2011. Greg Johnson has also served in numerous roles for NASA including as a Capcom for several missions. Gregory H. Johnson (Colonel, USAF, Ret.) was the President and executive director for the Center for the Advancement of Science in Space (CASIS) until March 10, 2018. He is now working with Lockheed Martin.

== Background ==
Johnson was born in South Ruislip, Greater London, United Kingdom. He graduated from Park Hills High School (now Fairborn High School), Fairborn, Ohio, in 1980. He is an Eagle Scout in the Boy Scouts of America. He earned a Bachelor of Science degree in aeronautical engineering from the United States Air Force Academy in 1984, a Master of Science in flight structures engineering from Columbia University in 1985, and a Master of Business Administration from the University of Texas at Austin in 2005. Johnson is married to the former Cari M. Harbaugh. They have three children, Matthew, Joseph, and Rachel.

== Military career ==
Johnson received his commission from the United States Air Force Academy in May 1984 and attended pilot training at Reese Air Force Base, Texas. He was retained as a T-38A instructor pilot until 1989, when he was selected for an F-15E Eagle assignment. After completing initial F-15E training, Johnson was assigned to the 335th Fighter Squadron, at Seymour Johnson Air Force Base, North Carolina. In December 1990, Johnson deployed to Al Kharj, Saudi Arabia, flying 34 combat missions in support of Operation Desert Storm. In December 1992, he was again deployed to Saudi Arabia for three months, flying an additional 27 combat missions in support of Operation Southern Watch. In 1993, he was selected for Air Force Test Pilot School at Edwards Air Force Base. After graduation, he was assigned to the 445th Flight Test Squadron at Edwards, where he flew and tested F-15C/E, NF-15B, and T-38A/B aircraft. He has logged over 5,000 flight hours in more than 50 different aircraft. The story of the name "Box" has been a mystery. During an interview with a group of Executive Management students at the University of Texas, Johnson stated that the origination of the name "Box Johnson" came from his tour in Desert Storm. Johnson incurred a back injury that led him to being sent home early. He put all of his belongings in a box and then he was taken back to the states. The box was left in the barracks as a reminder to all his fellow soldiers to stare at thinking about how he was at home. So after a while they wrote "Box Johnson" on the box and the name stuck.

== NASA career ==
Selected by NASA in June 1998, he reported for training in August 1998. He completed Astronaut Candidate Training in 2000. Following initial training and evaluation, astronaut candidates receive technical assignments within the Flight Crew Operations Directorate before being assigned to a space flight. In 2000, Johnson was assigned as a Technical Assistant to the Director, Flight Crew Operations Directorate (FCOD). In conjunction with that position, Johnson was assigned to the Shuttle Cockpit Avionics Upgrade (CAU) council – redesigning cockpit displays for future Space Shuttle missions. His design and evaluation work with CAU has continued to the present.

In 2001, Johnson was reassigned from FCOD to the Space Shuttle Branch, where he has held various positions including direct support to the crews of STS-100 and STS-108, chief of shuttle abort planning and procedures for contingency scenarios, and ascent procedure development. He also was a key player on several "tiger teams" during the investigation into the cause of the Columbia accident in 2003. Johnson was the astronaut representative to the External Tank (ET) foam impact test team that eventually proved that ET foam debris on ascent could critically damage the shuttle's leading edge thermal protection system. In 2004, Johnson was designated as the Deputy Chief of the Astronaut Safety Branch, focusing on all aspects of Space Shuttle, ISS, and T-38 safety, with special emphasis on improving specific operational procedures and techniques to make astronauts safer in all three vehicles. In 2005, Johnson was appointed as a crew representative supporting the design and testing of NASA's newest spacecraft, the Crew Exploration Vehicle. Johnson was the pilot on STS-123 which launched on March 11, 2008. Johnson was picked to be the mission's primary robotic arm operator.

He retired from the Air Force on February 1, 2009, and continued to serve NASA as a civilian.

Johnson was the pilot of STS-134, the final flight of Space Shuttle Endeavour and the penultimate flight of the Space Shuttle Program.

== Awards and honors ==
Johnson has been awarded the 2005 Stephen D. Thorne Top Fox Safety Award, the 2005 Dean's Award for Academic Excellence, McCombs School of Business, NASA Superior Performance Award, and the 1996 Lieutenant General Bobby Bond Award for the top Air Force test pilot. Johnson was a distinguished graduate of U.S. Air Force Test Pilot School and the U.S. Air Force Academy. His military decorations include the Distinguished Flying Cross, Meritorious Service Medal (2), Air Medal (4), Aerial Achievement Medal (3), Air Force Commendation Medal, and the Air Force Achievement Medal (2).
