= Dana Weigel =

American mechanical engineer at NASA

Dana J. Weigel
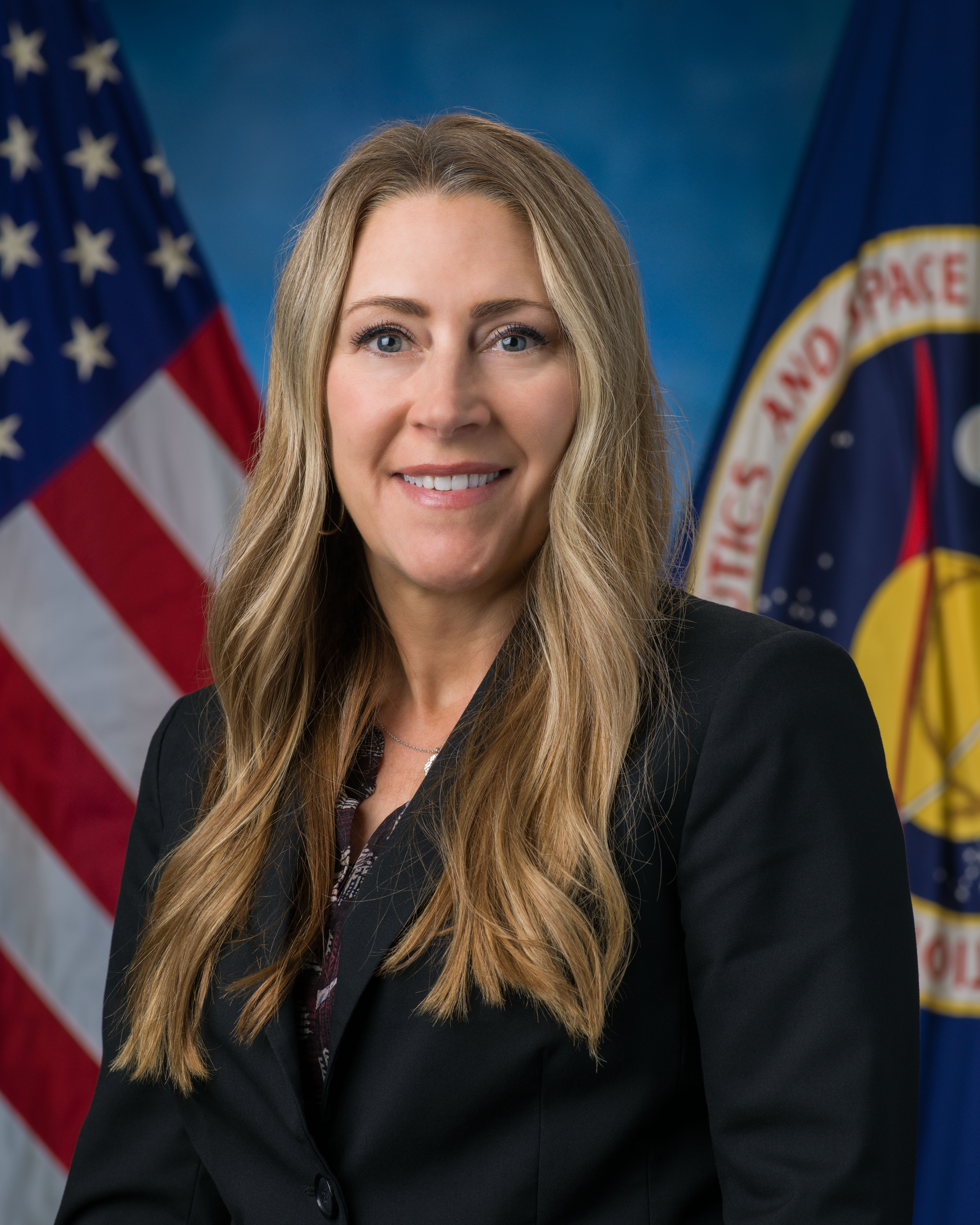
- Weigel in 2022
- Education: Texas A&M University (BS)
- Occupation: International Space Station Program Manager for NASA

Dana J. Weigel is an American aerospace engineer, the International Space Station Program Manager at NASA. She is responsible for the station's management, development, operation, and integration.

Weigel's responsibilities include managing NASA's portion of the program's budget, negotiating with international partners, contracting commercial cargo missions, overseeing onboard research, and ensuring crew safety.

Before assuming her current role on April 7, 2024, Weigel had been serving as the Deputy ISS Program Manager since 2021.

== Career ==
Weigel served as the manager of the Space Station Vehicle Office from 2014 to 2021. While there, she was responsible for sustaining, sparing, and developing systems and payload facility hardware. Along with these, she was also responsible for integrating commercial and international elements into the ISS.

From 2012 to 2014, Weigel served as the Deputy Chief of the Flight Director Office, leading the Extravehicular Activity (EVA) Recovery Team. She also held positions as Deputy Manager of the Mission Operations Space Transportation Division from 2010 to 2011, leading a NASA Headquarters-sponsored Geosynchronous Earth Orbit (GEO) satellite servicing habitat study.

Weigel was a NASA Flight Director from 2004 to 2014, serving as the lead Flight Director for Expedition 13, the STS-123 mission, and the first H-IIB Transfer Vehicle (HTV) mission.

Weigel began her career at Barrios Technology in 1994 as an EVA Officer.

She is a 1993 graduate of Texas A&M University where she earned a bachelor’s degree in mechanical engineering.

== Awards or recognition ==
- 2007 Rotary National Award for Space Achievement Foundation Stellar Award Winner-Early Career (for individuals up to age 33). For a history of strong technical ability and leadership resulting in her selection as a flight director in 2005, where she immediately began leading Mission Control in critical activities.
- 2000 Rotary National Award for Space Achievement Foundation Stellar Award Winner-Recent Graduate. For outstanding dedication, professionalism, and technical excellence in developing the Extra-Vehicular Activity procedures and conducting crew training for the successful third Hubble Space Telescope servicing mission.
