= Wadsworth City School District =

School district in Ohio, United States

Address
- 625 Broad Street Wadsworth, Ohio, 44281; United States

District information
- Type: Public
- Grades: PK–12
- Schools: 10
- NCES District ID: 3910029

Students and staff
- Students: 4,275 (2025–2026)
- Teachers: 254.08 (on an FTE basis) (2025–2026)
- Staff: 452.51 (on an FTE basis) (2025–2026)
- Student–teacher ratio: 16.83 (2025–2026)

Other information
- Website: www.wadsworthschools.org

Wadsworth City School District is a public school district in Wadsworth, Ohio. It serves over 4,000 students in grades K through 12 living in Wadsworth, Wadsworth Township, and portions of neighboring Guilford, Montville, and Sharon Townships.

== Schools ==
The district is divided into five neighborhood elementary schools housing grades K through 4, an intermediate School for 5th and 6th grades, a middle school for grades 7 and 8, and a high school for 9th through 12th grades.

- Wadsworth High School, grades 9–12
- Wadsworth Middle School, grades 7–8
- Wadsworth Intermediate School, grades 5–6
- Isham Elementary School, grades K–4
- Lincoln Elementary School, grades K–4
- Franklin Elementary School, grades K–4
- Overlook Elementary School, grades K–4
- Valley View Elementary School, grades K–4
