= Wadsworth, Ohio =

- City
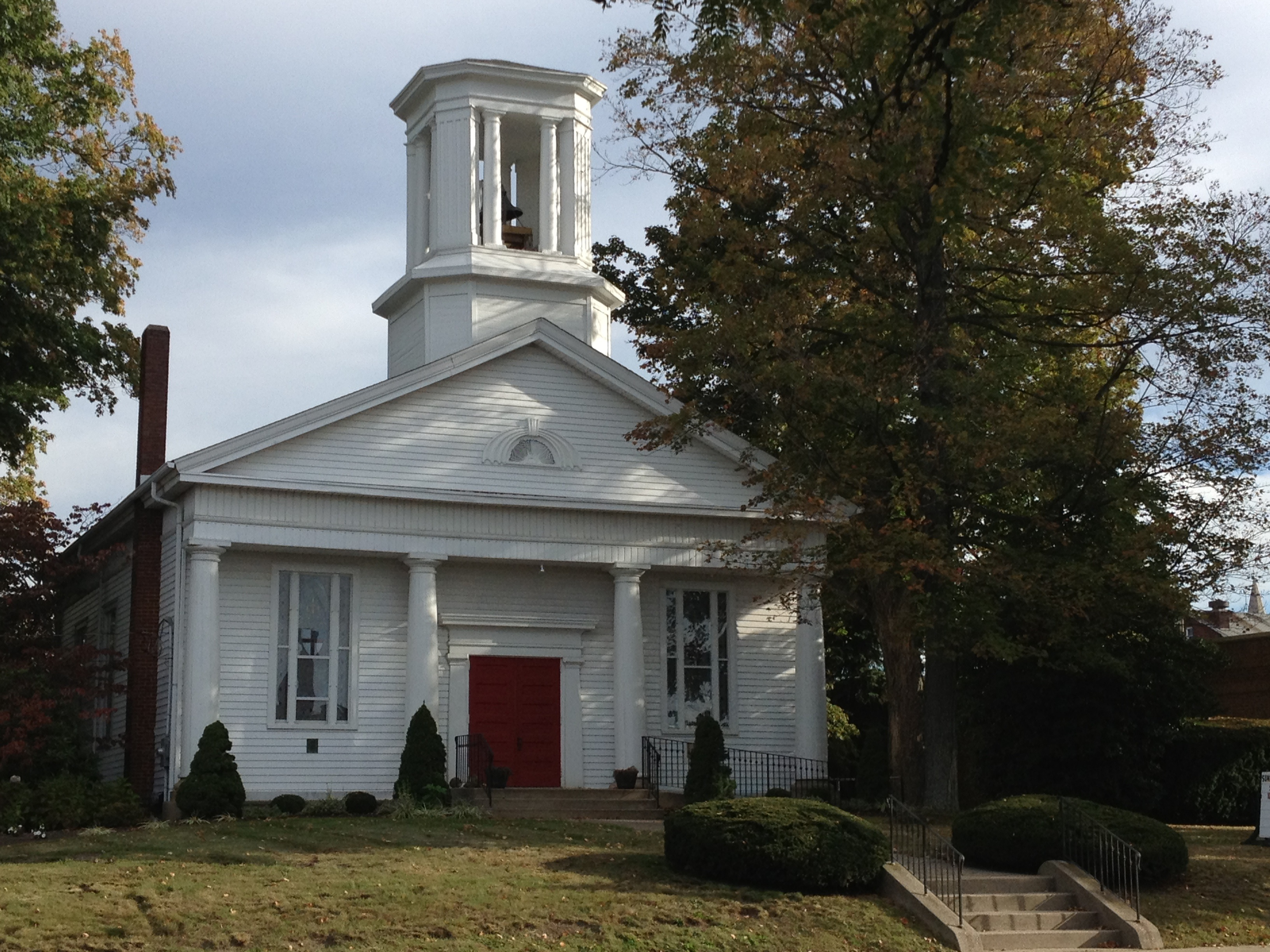
- St. Mark Church

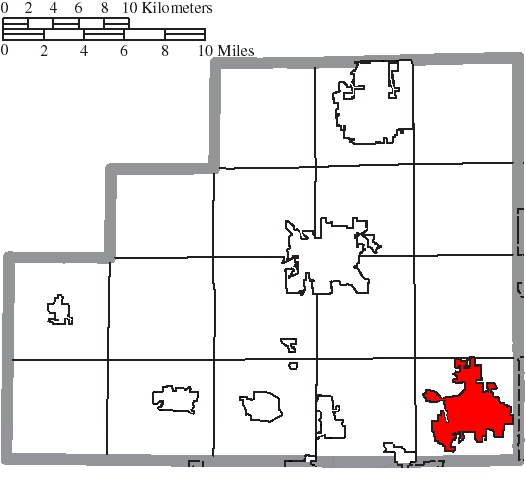
- Location of Wadsworth in Medina County

- Location within Ohio Location within the United States
- Coordinates: 41°01′10″N 81°44′35″W
- Country: United States
- State: Ohio
- County: Medina
- Founded: March 1, 1814; 212 years ago
- Incorporated: January 1, 1876; 150 years ago (village)
- Incorporated: January 1, 1931; 95 years ago (city)

Government
  - Type: Mayor-Council

Area
  - Total: 11.34 sq mi (29.38 km^{2})
  - Land: 11.34 sq mi (29.36 km^{2})
  - Water: 0.0077 sq mi (0.02 km^{2})
- Elevation: 1,165 ft (355 m)

Population (2020)
  - Total: 24,007
  - Density: 2,117.9/sq mi (817.72/km^{2})
- Time zone: UTC-5 (Eastern (EST))
  - Summer (DST): UTC-4 (EDT)
- ZIP codes: 44281-44282
- Area codes: 234, 330
- FIPS code: 39-80304
- GNIS feature ID: 2397162
- Website: https://www.wadsworthcity.com/

Wadsworth is a city in Medina County, Ohio, United States. Founded on March 1, 1814, the city was named after General Elijah Wadsworth, a Revolutionary War hero and War of 1812 officer who owned the largest share of the lands that became Medina County. The population of Wadsworth was 24,007 at the 2020 census.

== History ==
A post office called Wadsworth has been in operation since 1823.

In 1964, Wadsworth withdrew from Wadsworth Township by forming a paper township. The paper township originally went unnamed. In 2003, it was named Pardee Township, after Aaron Pardee, the first mayor of Wadsworth.

== Geography ==
According to the United States Census Bureau, the city has a total area of 10.62 square miles (27.51 km^{2}), all land. It is located just a few miles south of the Saint Lawrence River Divide. Wadsworth is located approximately 11.6 miles (18.7 km) southwest of Akron and 32.8 miles (52.8 km) south of Cleveland.

== Demographics ==
Historical population
Census	Pop.	Note	%±
1880	1,219		—
1890	1,576		29.3%
1900	1,764		11.9%
1910	3,073		74.2%
1920	4,742		54.3%
1930	5,920		24.8%
1940	6,495		9.7%
1950	7,966		22.6%
1960	10,635		33.5%
1970	13,142		23.6%
1980	15,187		15.6%
1990	15,718		3.5%
2000	18,437		17.3%
2010	21,567		17.0%
2020	24,007		11.3%

=== 2020 census ===
As of the 2020 census, Wadsworth had a population of 24,007. The median age was 39.7 years. 23.7% of residents were under the age of 18 and 19.1% of residents were 65 years of age or older. For every 100 females there were 91.9 males, and for every 100 females age 18 and over there were 88.5 males age 18 and over.

99.7% of residents lived in urban areas, while 0.3% lived in rural areas.

There were 9,793 households in Wadsworth, of which 30.8% had children under the age of 18 living in them. Of all households, 49.0% were married-couple households, 16.8% were households with a male householder and no spouse or partner present, and 27.6% were households with a female householder and no spouse or partner present. About 30.4% of all households were made up of individuals and 14.8% had someone living alone who was 65 years of age or older.

There were 10,335 housing units, of which 5.2% were vacant. The homeowner vacancy rate was 1.2% and the rental vacancy rate was 7.1%.

Racial composition as of the 2020 census
Race	Number	Percent
White	21,962	91.5%
Black or African American	288	1.2%
American Indian and Alaska Native	50	0.2%
Asian	306	1.3%
Native Hawaiian and Other Pacific Islander	10	0.0%
Some other race	144	0.6%
Two or more races	1,247	5.2%
Hispanic or Latino (of any race)	505	2.1%

=== 2010 census ===
As of the census of 2010, there were 21,567 people, 8,609 households, and 5,803 families residing in the city. The population density was 2,030.8 inhabitants per square mile (784.1/km^{2}). There were 9,320 housing units at an average density of 877.6 per square mile (338.8/km^{2}). The racial makeup of the city was 96.9% White, 0.8% African American, 0.2% Native American, 0.7% Asian, 0.2% from other races, and 1.1% from two or more races. Hispanic or Latino people of any race were 1.2% of the population.

There were 8,609 households, of which 33.8% had children under the age of 18 living with them, 54.2% were married couples living together, 9.6% had a female householder with no husband present, 3.6% had a male householder with no wife present, and 32.6% were non-families. 28.0% of all households were made up of individuals, and 12.6% had someone living alone who was 65 years of age or older. The average household size was 2.48 and the average family size was 3.05.

The median age in the city was 38.7 years. 25.6% of residents were under the age of 18; 7.3% were between the ages of 18 and 24; 26.2% were from 25 to 44; 25% were from 45 to 64; and 15.8% were 65 years of age or older. The gender makeup of the city was 48.1% male and 51.9% female.

Of the city's population over the age of 25, 31.2% held a bachelor's degree or higher.

=== 2000 census ===
As of 2000, the median income for a household in the city was $48,605, and the median income for a family was $58,850. Males had a median income of $41,626 versus $25,805 for females. The per capita income for the city was $22,859. 5.4% of the population and 4.2% of families were below the poverty line, including 5.7% of those under the age of 18 and 5.6% of those 65 and older.

== Arts and culture ==
The Blue Tip Festival is an annual event which includes a parade, amusement rides, foods, midway games, merchants, entertainment, and contests. The festival is named after the strike-anywhere blue tip matches which were once manufactured in Wadsworth until the 1980s.

The city is served by the Wadsworth Public Library.

== Education ==
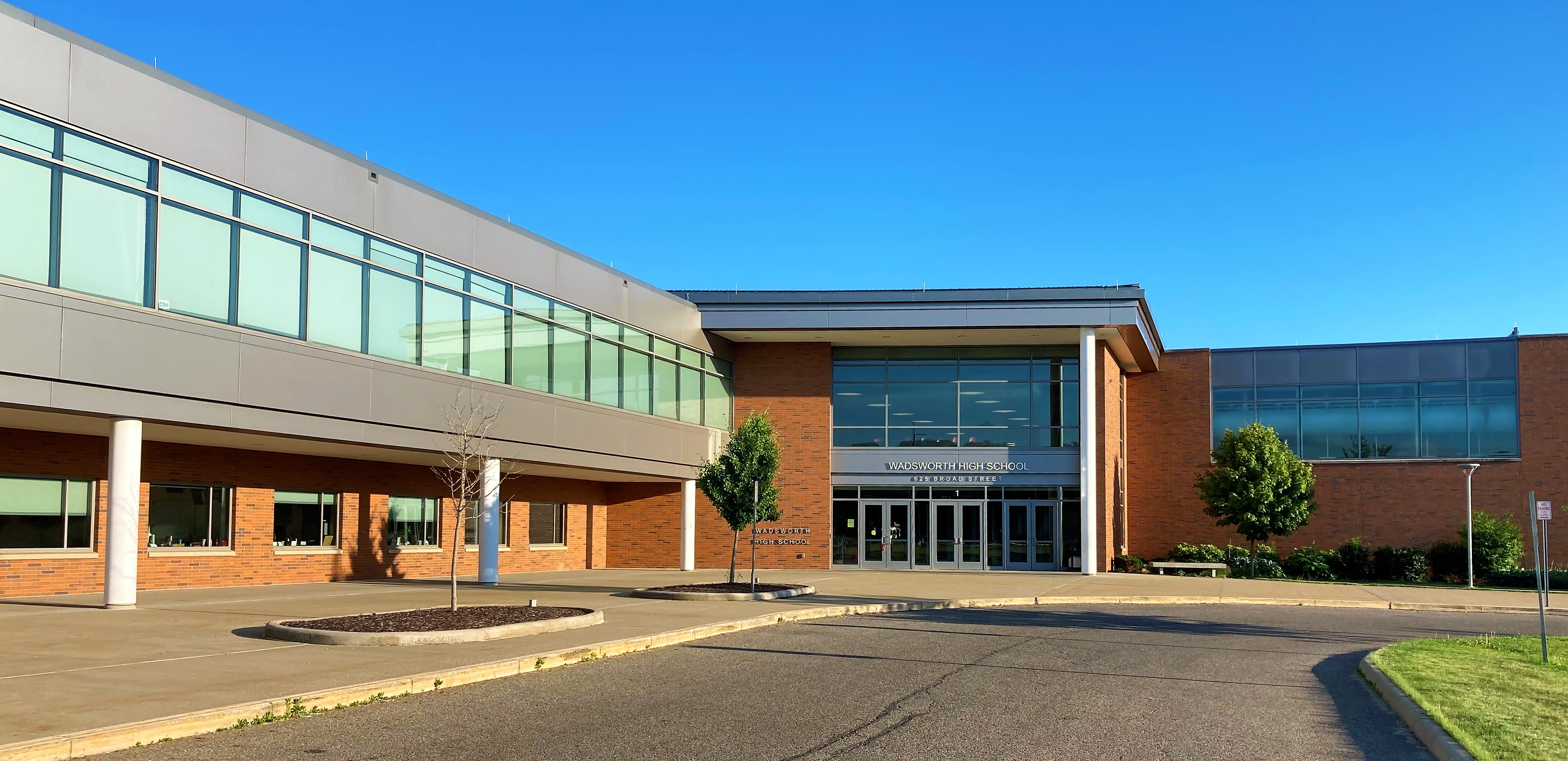
Wadsworth High School

The Wadsworth City School District is the single largest employer in the city. The district has benefited from the support of the community, which passed six of the last seven levies put before the voters. In addition, the district voters supported the Medina County Sales Tax (the first in Ohio), at a rate of 74% for the levy.

Wadsworth High School and Wadsworth Middle School are members of the Ohio High School Athletic Association.

Other schools in the city of Wadsworth include Sacred Heart School, a Roman Catholic parochial school serving Kindergarten through 8th grade.

== Media ==
Wadsworth is served by a daily newspaper, The Medina County Gazette, which is published every day of the week except Sundays. In addition, the Akron Beacon Journal and the Cleveland Plain Dealer occasionally cover the city and Medina County. Wadsworth is served by numerous television and radio stations from both the Greater Cleveland, Greater Akron and Greater Canton areas.

== Infrastructure ==
Wadsworth is served by the Wadsworth Municipal Airport, which is located 2 miles (3.22 km) southwest of the city. Skypark Airport is located 2 miles west of the city.I-76 traverses the city. State routes include OH-57, OH-94 and OH-261.

== Notable people ==
- Dwier Brown, actor in Field of Dreams
- Mitchell Evans, football player
- Nancy Everhard, actress
- Scott Fletcher, MLB infielder
- Michael Foreman, astronaut
- Ben Hess, NASCAR driver.
- Drew Pearson, Grammy Award-nominated songwriter
- Alban W. Purcell, 19th century stage actor
- Jim Renacci, former U.S. representative for Ohio's 16th congressional district and Mayor of Wadsworth
- Laura Spelman Rockefeller, wife of Standard Oil co-founder John D. Rockefeller
- Bishop Sankey, NFL running back
- Andy Sonnanstine, MLB pitcher
- Wilbur H. Tousley, Wisconsin State Assembly and newspaper publisher
- Carolyn Treffinger, children's author
