= Wadsworth High School =

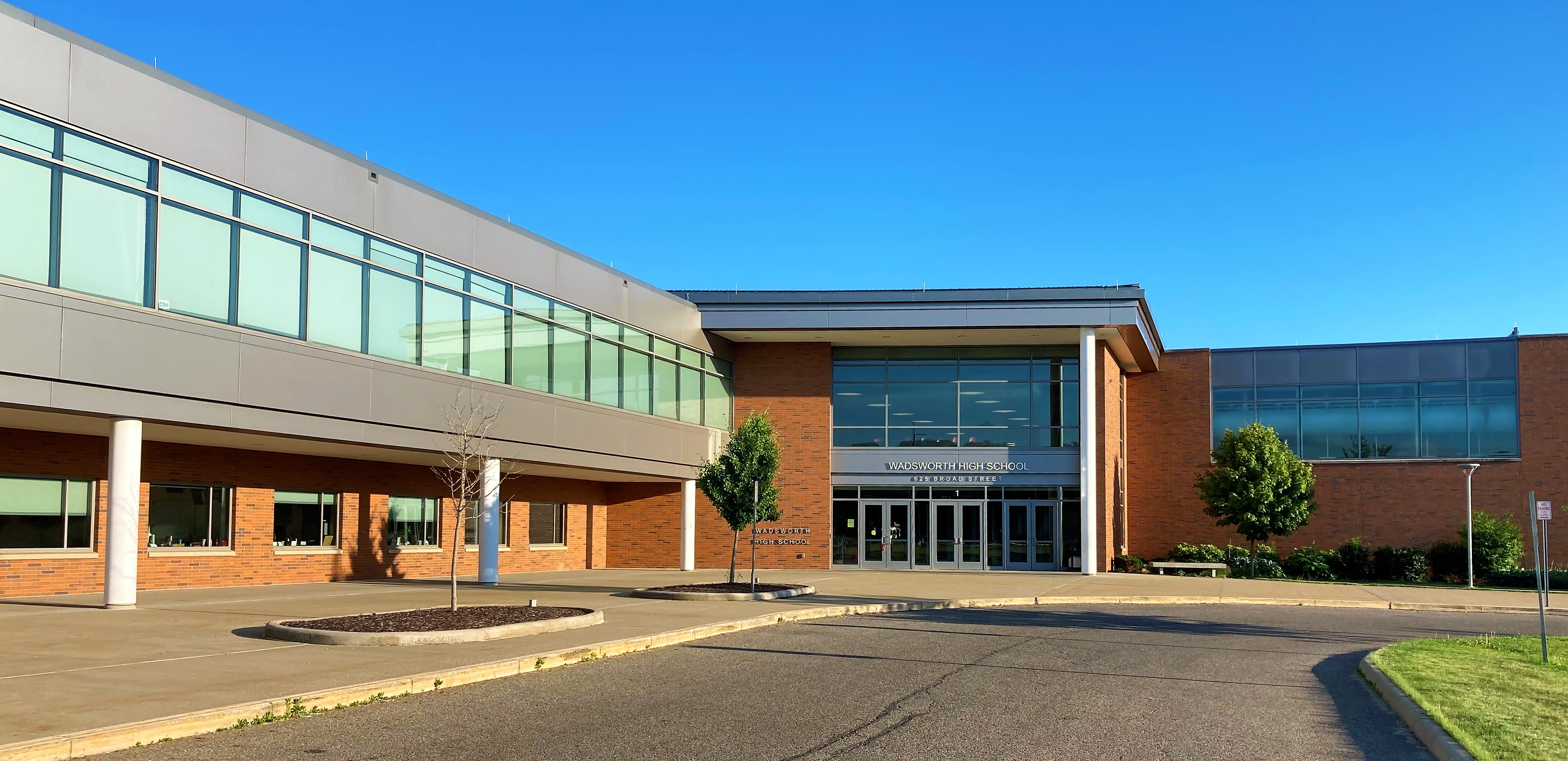

Location
- 625 Broad Street; Wadsworth, Ohio 44281; United States
- Coordinates: 41°1′26″N 81°42′36″W

Information
- Type: Public
- School district: Wadsworth City School District
- Principal: Vincent Suber
- Staff: 81.26 (FTE)
- Grades: 9–12
- Enrollment: 1,591 (2023-24)
- Student to teacher ratio: 19.58
- Colors: Red, white, and black
- Athletics conference: Suburban League; National Division
- Nickname: Grizzlies
- Newspaper: The Bruin
- Yearbook: Whisperer
- Website: whs.wadsworthschools.org

Wadsworth High School is a public high school for grades 9 through 12 in Wadsworth, Ohio, United States. It is the only high school in the Wadsworth City School District. The school colors are red and white and sports teams are nicknamed the Grizzlies. The current building opened in 2012 and is located beside Wadsworth Middle School.

== Athletics ==
=== State championships ===
- Boys wrestling – 1942, 2010
- Girls cross country – 1979, 1980
- Girls basketball – 1997, 2016

== Notable alumni ==
- Savannah Brown; poet and author
- Mitchell Evans; professional Football Player in the National Football League (NFL)
- Nancy Everhard; actress
- Scott Fletcher; professional baseball player in Major League Baseball (MLB)
- Michael Foreman; astronaut
- Bob Jones; professional football player in the National Football League (NFL)
- Andy Sonnanstine; professional baseball player in MLB
- Brad Warner; Buddhism author
