= Savannah Brown =

American-British poet (born 1996)

- Born: 21 July 1996 (age 30); Cleveland, Ohio, U.S.
- Occupations: Poet, author, twitch streamer
- Years active: 2011–present
- Website: www.savbrown.com

Savannah Brown (born 21 July 1996) is an American–British poet and author.

== Early life ==
Brown was born in Cleveland, Ohio. She credits the poems of Edgar Allan Poe and her eleventh grade English teacher for cultivating her interest in poetry. She graduated from Wadsworth High School in 2014 then shortly after moved to London.

== Career ==
Brown gained prominence after videos of her performing original poems, one exploring the topic of self-love and another about female sexuality, went viral.

At age 19 Brown self-published a collection of poetry titled Graffiti (and other poems), which was a finalist in the Goodreads Choice Awards. In 2020 she released a second poetry collection called Sweetdark. Writing about Sweetdark for i-D, Jenna Mahale notes the collection "explores how we live vulnerably, pleasurably, and chaotically at the end of the world". In Redbrick, Sam Wait states "Brown has succeeded in writing a collection that, though deeply personal, is universally relatable". Of her poetry, Brown has said "I’m interested in [...] acknowledging that so many small and human things are happening while out of frame there’s, like, a star collapsing". In Our Culture Mag, Konstantinos Pappis describes Brown's work as having "a mix of wry self-awareness and earnest sincerity".

It was announced in 2018 that Brown had signed a two-book deal with Penguin Random House. The first book was published in 2019, a young adult thriller called The Truth About Keeping Secrets about a teenager dealing with intense grief after the sudden death of her father. Brown has said the story was inspired by her own fear of death. The book was generally well-received, a review from Kirkus citing it as a "captivatingly moody, introspective drama". Writing for Booklist, Rob Bittner says Brown's debut "will satisfy fans of mystery who yearn for a proverbial path of breadcrumbs leading to a hopeful, satisfying conclusion". Her second novel The Things We Don't See was released in 2021. Brown's novels are recognized for their LGBT protagonists.

In 2019 Brown started a 30-day poetry challenge called Escapril in which participants are tasked to write an original poem every day of April, which she still runs annually. More than 90,000 poems have been written for the event since.

Brown has also acted as a judge for the National Poetry Day competition run in collaboration with Arts Council England and The Poetry Society.

Brown started streaming on Twitch in early 2023.

== Personal life ==
Brown is autistic and identifies as bisexual. In April 2023, she became a British citizen. She is currently residing in Edinburgh. Since early 2026, Brown has run a Patreon page where she posts pictures of her feet.

== Bibliography ==
=== Collections ===
- Graffiti (and other poems) (2016)
- Sweetdark (2020)
- Closer Baby Closer (2023)

=== Novels ===
- The Truth About Keeping Secrets (Penguin Random House, 2019)
- The Things We Don't See (Penguin Random House, 2021)
