= Wadsworth Public Library =

Medina County, Ohio, U.S.

Coordinates: 41°01′33″N 81°43′42″W

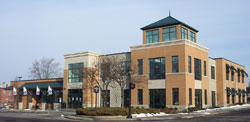
Wadsworth, Ohio library building

The Wadsworth Ella M. Everhard Public Library, in Wadsworth, Ohio, is an independent library serving the city of Wadsworth, Wadsworth Township and parts of Guilford Township in Medina County, Ohio. As of 2011, the library had about 250,000 visits a year.

== History ==
The first circulating library in Wadsworth was established by Judge Frederick Brown in 1822, who brought a collection of books with him when he relocated to Ohio from Connecticut.

One hundred years later, the Wadsworth Federation of Women's Clubs donated $50 for the establishment of a permanent library. Two hundred books borrowed from the State Library of Ohio were housed in one of the schools. The books were primarily used by students, with the collection being maintained by a committee of the Women's Club.

From 1923 until 1925, the library moved from location to location, at one point taking over most of the mayor's office.

In 1925, Mrs. Ella M. Everhard paid $17,000 to purchase the Thomas Leiter house. She donated it to the village for use as a public library and a meeting place for Wadsworth's various women's cultural organizations.

The library budget is supplemented by book sales run by the Friends of the Library.

== Library services ==
The Wadsworth Public Library provides books for all ages; AV materials including videos, DVDs, music CDs, and books on tape, CD, and MP3; programs for children, teens, and adults; free Internet access, both through library-owned public computers and wireless access throughout the building; public copiers and fax machine; free meeting space for non-profit groups; and an Outreach Services Department that provides library service to area schools, neighborhoods, senior housing, and those confined to home.
