= St. Mark's Episcopal Church (Wadsworth, Ohio) =

Historic church in Ohio, United States

- U.S. National Register of Historic Places
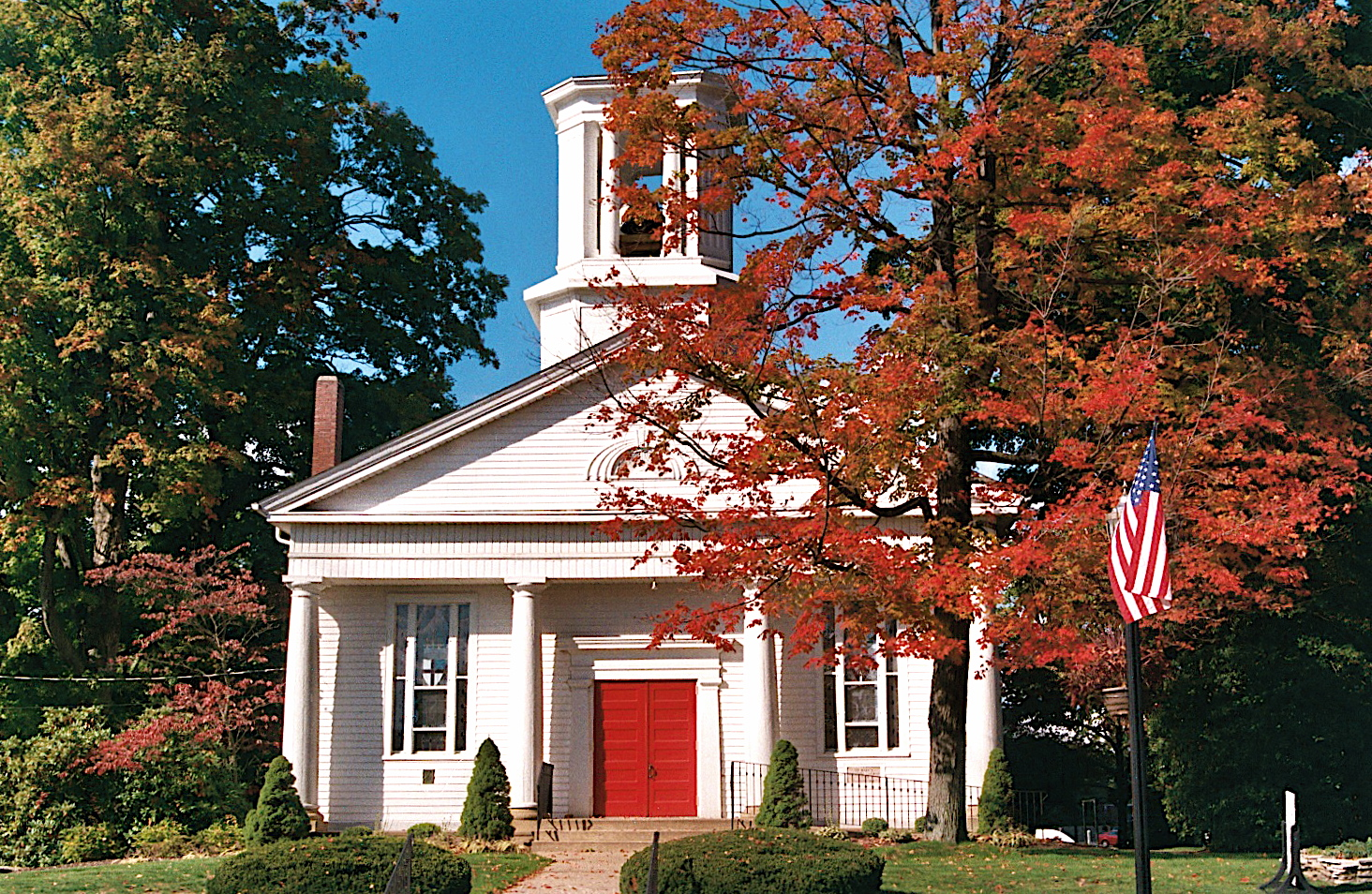

- Location within Ohio Location within the United States
- Location: 146 College St., Wadsworth, Ohio
- Coordinates: 41°1′33″N 81°43′53″W
- Area: less than one acre
- Built: 1842
- Architectural style: Greek Revival
- NRHP reference No.: 73001506
- Added to NRHP: February 6, 1973

St. Mark's Episcopal Church (Wadsworth Congregational Church or Old Mennonite Church) is a historic church building at 146 College Street, Wadsworth, Ohio.

Built in 1842, it was added to the National Register of Historic Places in 1973. The Episcopal congregation held its final service on March 6, 2022, and was closed by the Diocese of Ohio. As of 2023, the building is occupied by LifeSong Fellowship, a congregation of the Anglican Diocese of the Great Lakes.
