= 69th Illinois Infantry Regiment =

69th Regiment Illinois Volunteer Infantry
- Illinois state flag
- Active: June 16, 1862, to September 27, 1862
- Country: United States
- Allegiance: Union
- Branch: Infantry
- Engagements: None

The 69th Regiment Illinois Volunteer Infantry was an infantry regiment that served in the Union Army during the American Civil War.

== Service ==
The 69th Illinois Infantry was organized at Camp Douglas at Chicago, Illinois and mustered into Federal service on June 16, 1862, for a term of three months. It served as camp guards of Camp Douglas during its time in service.

The regiment was mustered out on September 27, 1862.

== Total strength and casualties ==
The regiment suffered 25 enlisted men who died of disease, for a total of 25 fatalities.

== Commanders ==
- Colonel Joseph H. Tucker - mustered out with the regiment.

== See also ==
- List of Illinois Civil War Units
- Illinois in the American Civil War
