= Crew equipment interface test =

A crew equipment interface test (CEIT) was a training procedure that helped spaceflight crewmembers gain first-hand knowledge of the flight hardware used during a space shuttle mission. For International Space Station assembly tasks, NASA conducted CEIT activities in the Space Station Processing Facility at Kennedy Space Center (KSC). The last CEIT was conducted April 7–8, 2011 by the STS-135 crew involving the space shuttle Atlantis in preparation for the final flight of the shuttle program.
