= Michael Foreman (astronaut) =

American astronaut and politician (born 1957)

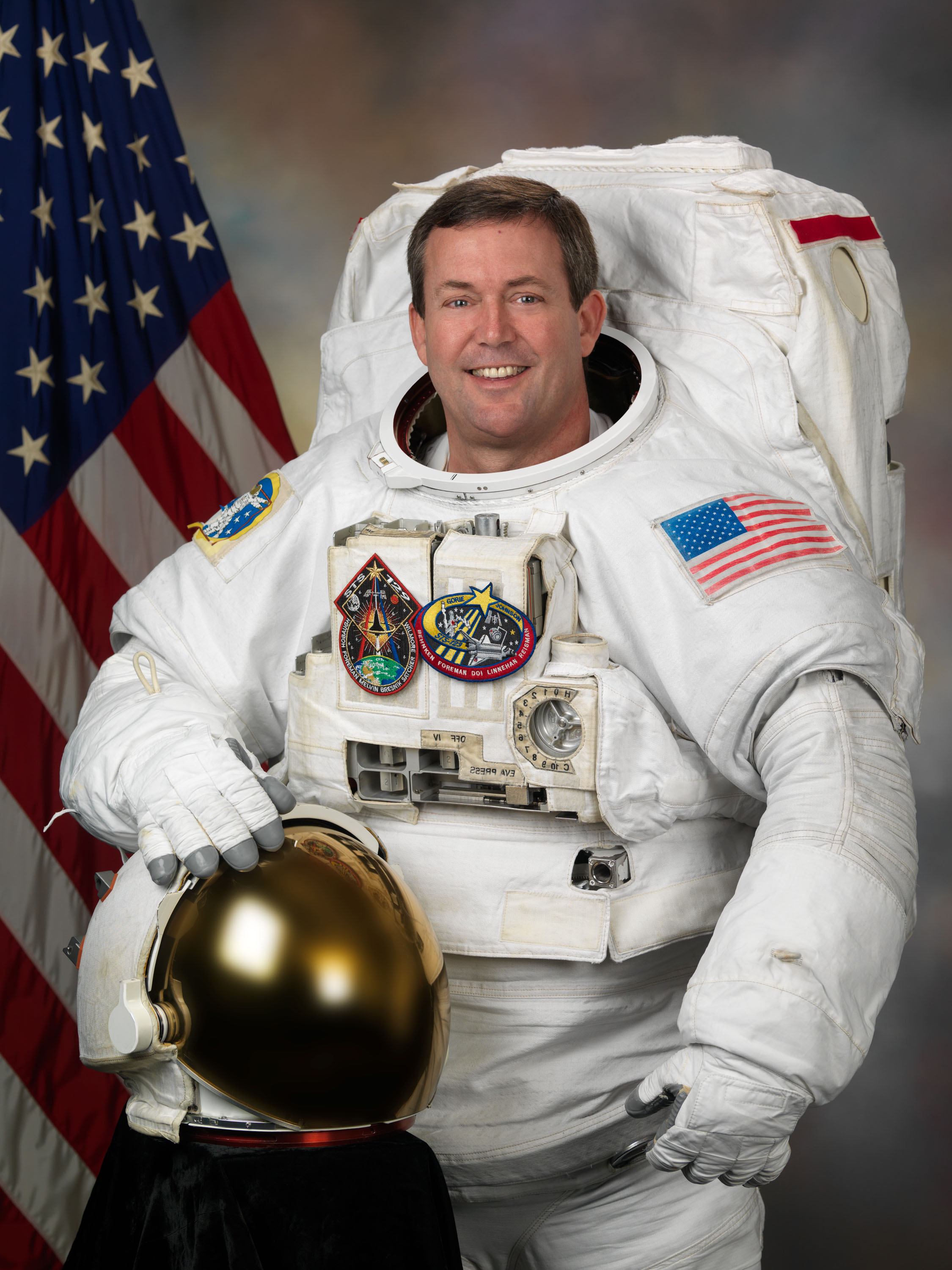
- Foreman in 2009

Mayor of Friendswood
- Incumbent
- Assumed office May 5, 2018
- Preceded by: Kevin Holland

Personal details
- Born: Michael James Foreman; March 29, 1957 (age 69) Columbus, Ohio, U.S.
- Education: United States Naval Academy (BS); Naval Postgraduate School (MS)

Military service
- Branch/service: United States Navy
- Years of service: 1981–2009
- Rank: Captain
- Awards: Legion of Merit; Defense Meritorious Service Medal; Navy Commendation Medal; Navy Achievement Medal
Michael Foreman
- Space career
NASA astronaut
- Time in space: 26d 13h 27m
- Selection: NASA Group 17 (1998)
- Total EVAs: 5
- Total EVA time: 32h 19m
- Missions: STS-123; STS-129
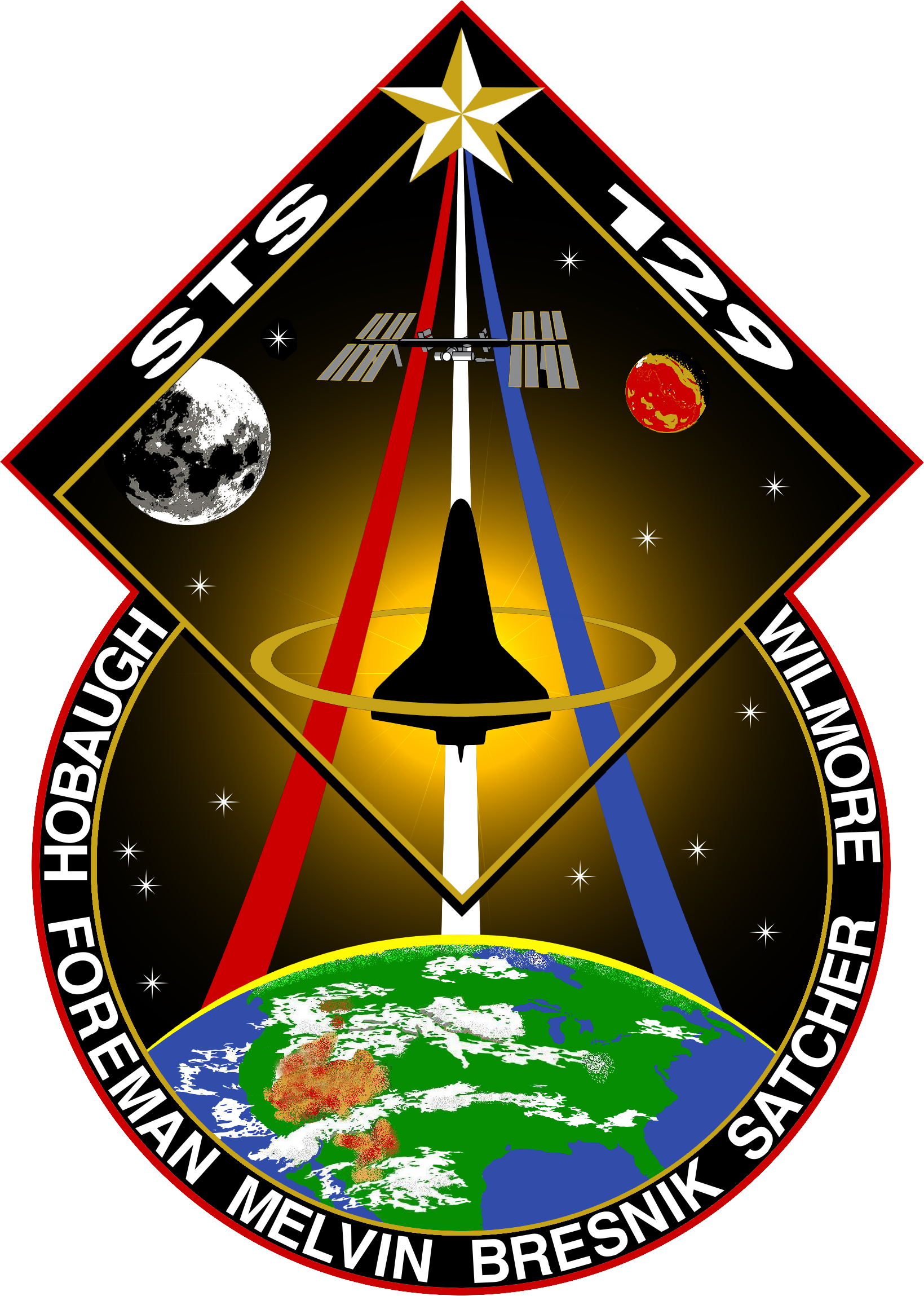
- Mission insignia
- Retired: July 31, 2015

Michael James Foreman (born March 29, 1957) is a retired U.S. Navy pilot, NASA astronaut, and local politician. While with NASA, Foreman was part of a mission that delivered the Japanese Experiment Module and the Canadian Special Purpose Dexterous Manipulator to the International Space Station. Foreman was also a crewmember of the STS-129 mission in November 2009. In 2018, he was elected mayor of Friendswood, Texas; he was re-elected to a second 3-year term in 2021. He is running unopposed and will serve a third 3-year term beginning in 2024.

== Background ==
Foreman was born in Columbus, Ohio, and grew up in Wadsworth, Ohio. He is married to Lorrie Dancer of Oklahoma City, Oklahoma. His wife Lorrie is a civil engineer. They have three children.

He graduated from Wadsworth High School, Wadsworth, Ohio, in 1975; received a Bachelor of Science degree in Aerospace Engineering from the U.S. Naval Academy in 1979, and a Master of Science degree in Aeronautical Engineering from the U.S. Naval Postgraduate School in 1986.

== Military career ==
Foreman was designated a Naval Aviator in January 1981 and assigned to Patrol Squadron 23 (VP-23) at NAS Brunswick, Maine. He made deployments to Rota, Spain; Lajes, Azores; Bermuda and Panama. Following this tour he attended the U.S. Naval Postgraduate School in Monterey, California where he earned a Master of Science degree in Aeronautical Engineering in 1986. As a graduate student, Foreman conducted thesis research at the NASA Ames Research Center at Moffett Field, California. Following graduation he was assigned as the Assistant Air Operations Officer aboard USS Coral Sea homeported in Norfolk, Virginia. In addition to his Air Operations duties, he flew as an E-2 Hawkeye pilot with VAW-120 and VAW-127. Upon selection to the U.S. Naval Test Pilot School in 1989, he moved to NAS Patuxent River, Maryland. He graduated in June 1990 and was assigned to the Force Warfare Aircraft Test Directorate. In 1991 he was reassigned as a flight instructor and the Operations Officer at U.S. Naval Test Pilot School. During his tenure there he instructed in the F/A-18, P-3 Orion, T-2, T-38 Talon, U-21, DHC-2 and the X-26 Frigate glider.

In 1993, Foreman was assigned to the Naval Air Systems Command in Crystal City, Virginia, first as the deputy, and then as the Class Desk (Chief Engineer) Officer for the T-45 Goshawk aircraft program. Following that tour he returned to NAS Patuxent River, this time as the Military Director for the Research and Engineering Group of the Naval Air Warfare Center Aircraft Division. In addition to his duties at Patuxent River, he was assigned as the Navy liaison to NASA's Advanced Orbiter Cockpit Project at the Johnson Space Center in Houston, Texas. Foreman was working as the technical lead for the Advanced Orbiter Cockpit Project team when he was selected for the astronaut program as part of the 1998 class of 25 astronaut candidates.

He has logged over 7,000 hours in more than 50 different aircraft.

== NASA career ==
Selected by NASA in June 1998, he reported for training in August 1998. Astronaut Candidate Training included orientation briefings and tours, numerous scientific and technical briefings, intensive instruction in Space Shuttle and International Space Station systems, physiological training and ground school to prepare for T-38 flight training, as well as learning water and wilderness survival techniques. He was initially assigned technical duties in the Astronaut Office Space Station Branch where he represented the Astronaut Office on training issues. He was then assigned to the Space Shuttle Branch as a liaison between the Johnson Space Center and the Kennedy Space Center, and also served as the Deputy, Space Shuttle Branch.

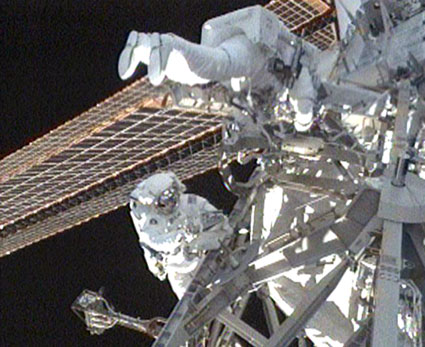
Foreman and Satcher during EVA1, STS-129

Foreman was selected as a mission specialist for the STS-123 mission in January 2007. The STS-123 Endeavour mission launched in November 2008 and delivered the Japanese Experiment Module and the Canadian Special Purpose Dexterous Manipulator to the International Space Station. During the mission, Foreman performed three Extrvehicular Activities (EVAs): the first in support of assembly of Dextre; the second to assess experimental tile materials; and the third to relocate the Orbiter Boom Sensor System.

Foreman was also a crewmember of the STS-129 mission in November 2009. STS-129 was the first flight of an ExPRESS Logistics Carrier that are designed to support equipment deliveries for the International Space Station. As a mission specialist on the flight, Foreman performed two additional EVAs bringing his total experience between two flights to five spacewalks. The two spacewalks added 12 hours and 45 minutes to his EVA time

A veteran of two space flights, Foreman has logged more than 637 hours in space, including 32 hours and 19 minutes of EVA in five spacewalks.

Foreman retired from NASA in July 2015 after a 35 year career in U.S. Government service between the U.S. Navy and NASA.

== Post-government service ==
Retiring from NASA, Foreman joined Venturi Outcomes, LLC, a Houston-based construction project management and consulting firm started by his wife. He was elected to the Friendswood Texas City Council in 2016. In 2018, Foreman was elected mayor of Friendswood, Texas. He ran unopposed and was re-elected to a second three-year term in 2021.

== Awards and honors ==
Foreman is a member of the Association of Naval Aviation, United States Naval Academy Alumni Association, the Society of Experimental Test Pilots, and the Association of Space Explorers.

He has received the Legion of Merit, Defense Meritorious Service Medal, Meritorious Service Medal, Navy Commendation Medal; Navy Achievement Medal and various other service awards.

He graduated with Distinction from the U.S. Naval Postgraduate School; received the Admiral William Adger Moffett Aeronautics Award, U.S. Naval Postgraduate School; was a Distinguished Graduate from the U.S. Naval Test Pilot School; and received the Empire Test Pilots School-sponsored award for best final report (DT-IIA) while at the U.S. Naval Test Pilot School.
