= Node module =

Node module may refer to:

- Unity (ISS module), an American ISS node
- Harmony (ISS module), an American ISS node
- Tranquillity (ISS module), an American ISS node
- Node 4, a proposed American ISS node
- Uzlovoy Module, Nodal Module, a Russian ISS node
