= ISS node =

ISS node may refer to:

- Unity (ISS module), node 1
- Harmony (ISS module), node 2
- Tranquility (ISS module), node 3
- Node 4, partially constructed, once considered for the ISS
