= Exploration Gateway Platform =

Original station design concept of the Lunar Gateway

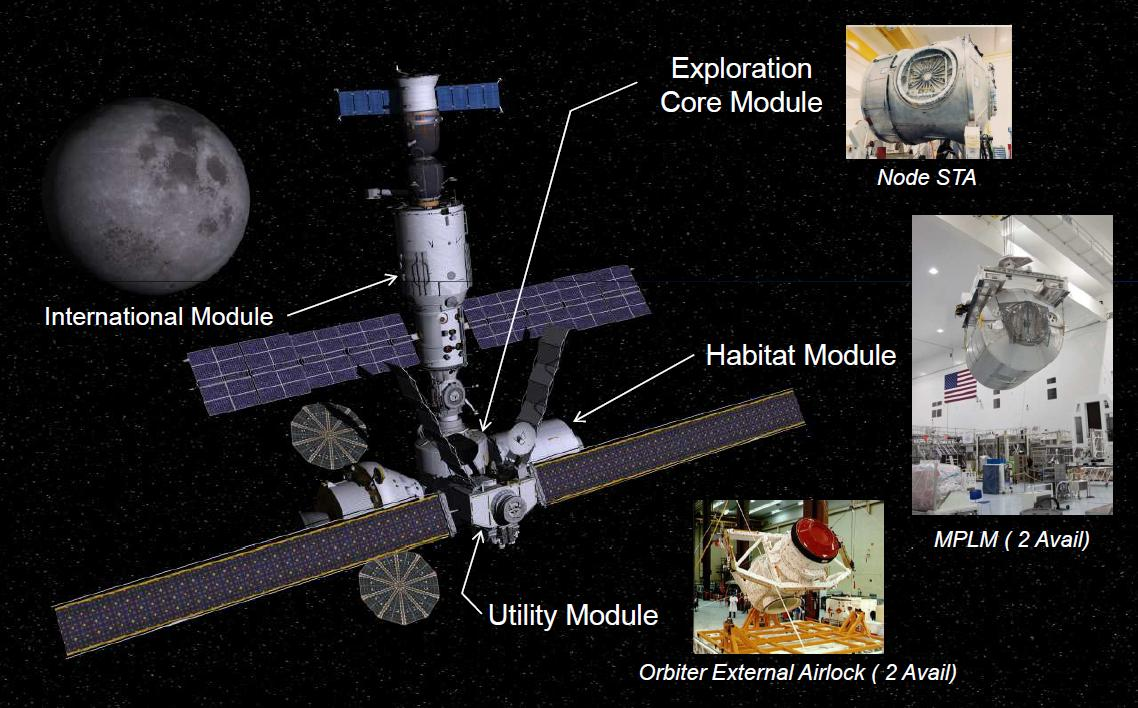
- Illustration concept of the Exploration Gateway Platform (as of 2011)

Station statistics
- Crew: 3
- Launch: 2020s (planned)
- Carrier rocket: EELV, Falcon 9 or SLS (planned)
- Mission status: Proposed/cancelled
- Mass: 46,800 kg (103,200 lb)
- Typical orbit altitude: Earth–Moon Lagrange point (L1 or L2)
- Days occupied: 90 days (planned)

The Exploration Gateway Platform was a design concept proposed by Boeing in December 2011 to drastically reduce the cost of Moon, near Earth asteroids (NEAs), or Mars missions by using components already designed to construct a refueling depot and servicing station located at one of the Earth–Moon Lagrange points, L1 or L2. The system claims its cost savings based on an ability to be reused for multiple missions such as a launch platform for deep space exploration, robotic relay station for moon rovers, telescope servicing and a deep space practice platform located outside the Earth's protective radiation belts.

Initial plans call for the Platform to be constructed at the International Space Station (ISS) for testing before being relocated to EM-L1 or EM-L2 via electric or chemical propulsion rockets. However, in 2013 this was revised to be assembled directly on EM-L1 or EM-L2, with each component launched by an SLS rocket.

The design was partly used for the by 2026 paused Lunar Gateway program.

== Construction ==
The Platform would consist of parts left over from the ISS program. Parts under consideration were Node 4 to form the main connection point, parts from the Space Shuttle's Orbital Maneuvering System (OMS) and Orbiter External Airlock would be combined to form a utility module for maneuvering, orientation and Extra-vehicular activity (EVA), a smaller version of the Canadian Arm to help with logistic and station-keeping, TransHab and/or possible inclusion of a 'Zvezda 2' or a Bigelow Inflatable station for life support systems, crew accommodations, storage, and laboratory space. Most components would be lifted into orbit using currently available EELV or commercial launchers like the Falcon 9.

A reusable lander would be positioned at the platform for Moon landings and refueled using NASA's new SLS heavy lift vehicle, where the Far Side of the Moon can also be accessed by crew for the first time. Missions to near-Earth asteroids were also considered as one of its potential uses.

== See also ==
- Space station
  - Deep Space Habitat
  - Nautilus-X
  - Skylab II
- Artemis program
