= ISS Propulsion Module =

Proposed International Space Station module

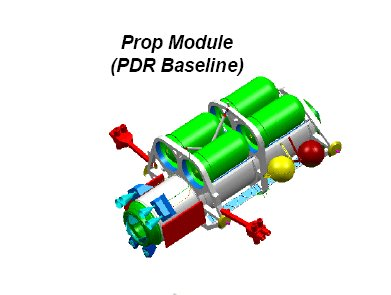
ISS Propulsion Module (NASA)

The ISS Propulsion module was proposed as a backup to functions performed by the Zvezda Service Module and Progress spacecraft. Critical ISS functionality such as guidance, navigation, control and propulsion are provided only by Russian (Zvezda and Progress) and the European (ATV) spacecraft. A Propulsion Module would have been needed for ISS altitude maintenance and reboost, debris avoidance maneuvers, attitude control and propellant supply in the event the Zvezda Service Module was not available (launch failure, etc.) to the International Space Station. If the Zvezda had not been available, the Interim Control Module would have been used at first. It only had a lifetime of three years; then the Propulsion Module would have been necessary.

== History ==
The ISS requires an average 7,000 kg of propellant each year for altitude maintenance, debris avoidance and attitude control. A Propulsion Module would have provided reserve propellant for one year of ISS orbit life in case of supply interruption. A Propulsion Module would have been attached to the Unity node of the ISS.

Multiple supply vehicles are required to satisfy the ISS's 7,000 kg annual average propellant need. The then-current plan for six Progress M1 spacecraft per year met that need.

The Propulsion Module would hold 9808 kg fuel. Progress M holds 1100 kg; Progress M1 holds 1950 kg. ESA ATV holds 4,000 kg. The cancelled U.S. Interim Control Module holds 5000 kg of fuel. A Shuttle Orbiter ISS generic reboost had 232 kg of fuel available. An Orbiter Max reboost mission had 1626 kg of reboost fuel available. Zarya FGB [Russian: ФГБ - Функциональный Грузовой Блок, English: Functional (or Operational) Cargo Block (or Module)] holds 5,500 kg and the Zvezda Service module holds 860 kg, however, it is generally preferred to keep the main thrusters on Zarya and Zvezda in reserve, as they have finite lifespans.

The Propulsion Module, besides being part of the backup plan for if the Service Module was not available, was intended to be an American-owned propulsion system for the station and planned as a late addition. However, the original design was over budget and late. An alternative design, the "Node X" design, which was built around an improperly fabricated hull intended for Node 2 or 3, was then proposed and tentatively included in the plan, designed with two detachable fuel modules that could be carried up and down in a Shuttle cargo bay for replacement to avoid the problems of transferring propellant between tanks in space. It has subsequently been deleted from the plans, instead requiring the station to rely on the ATV and Progress spacecraft for reboost. Furthermore, in the wake of the Shuttle's retirement, further redesign of the Propulsion Module would have been necessary.

== See also ==
- Node 4
