= Space Systems Processing Facility =

Building used for manufacturing and preparation of space systems

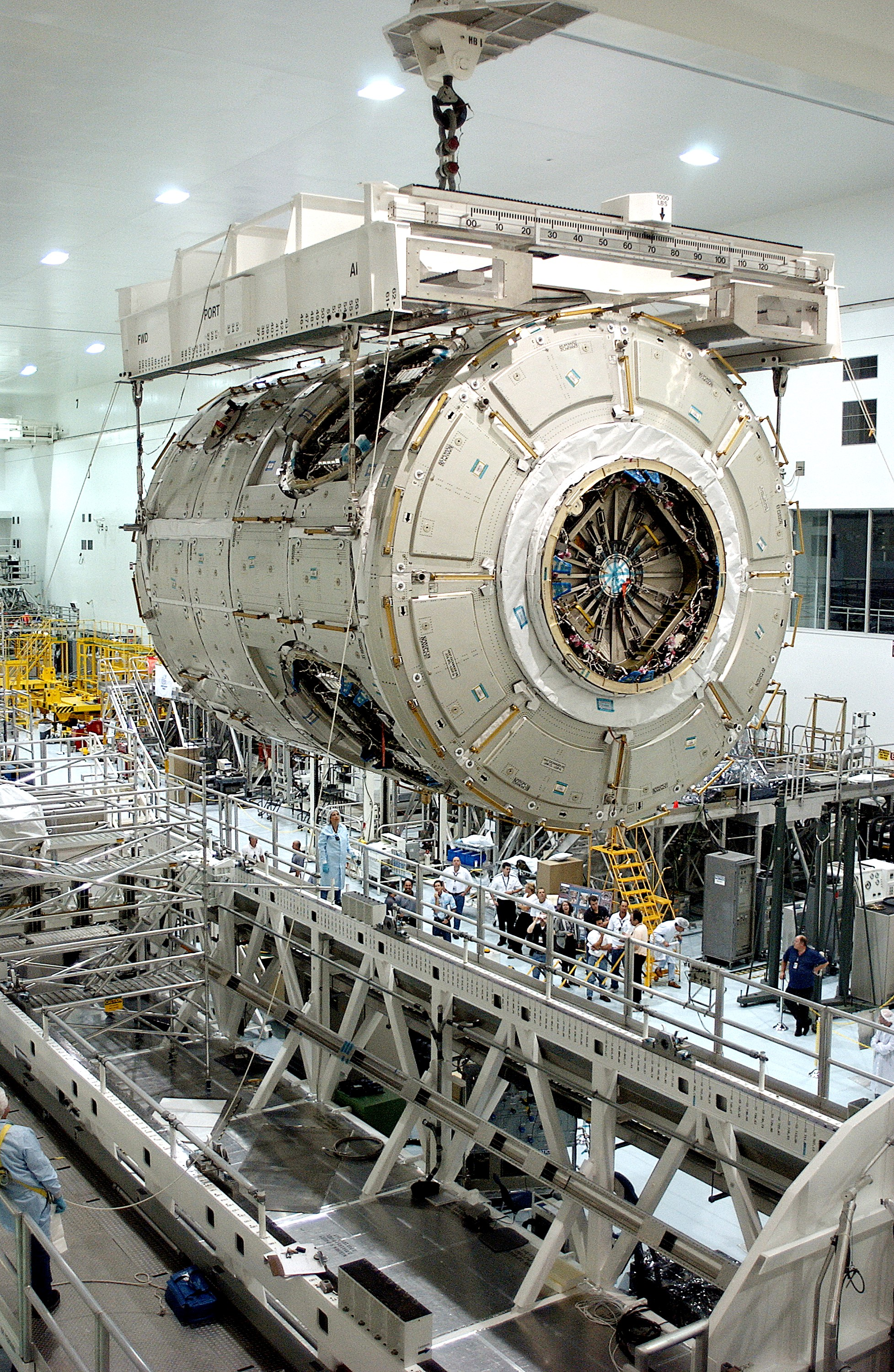
- Interior of the SSPF, showing Node 2 being hoisted by overhead cranes

- Location in Florida Space Systems Processing Facility (the United States)
- Built: 1992
- Location: NASA Parkway East; Kennedy Space Center
- Coordinates: 28°31′26″N 80°38′39″W
- Industry: Aerospace and Space Technology
- Products: Spacecraft and space systems equipment
- Employees: 700+
- Architect: KSC Management
- Buildings: 1
- Area: 42,500 m^{2} (457,000 sq ft)
- Volume: 111,888 m^{3} (3,951,300 cu ft) (high bay); 13,905 m^{3} (491,100 cu ft) (Intermediate bay)
- Owner: NASA

The Space Systems Processing Facility (SSPF), originally the Space Station Processing Facility, is a three-story industrial building at Kennedy Space Center for the manufacture and processing of flight hardware, modules, structural components and solar arrays of the International Space Station, and future space stations and commercial spacecraft. It was built in 1992 at the space complex's industrial area, just east of the Operations and Checkout Building.

The SSPF includes two processing bays, an airlock, operational control rooms, laboratories, logistics areas for equipment and machines, office space, a ballroom and conference halls, and a cafeteria. The processing areas, airlock, and laboratories are designed to support non-hazardous Space Station and Space Shuttle payloads in 100,000 class clean work areas. The building has a total floor area of 42,500 m^{2} (457,000 sq ft).

== History and construction ==
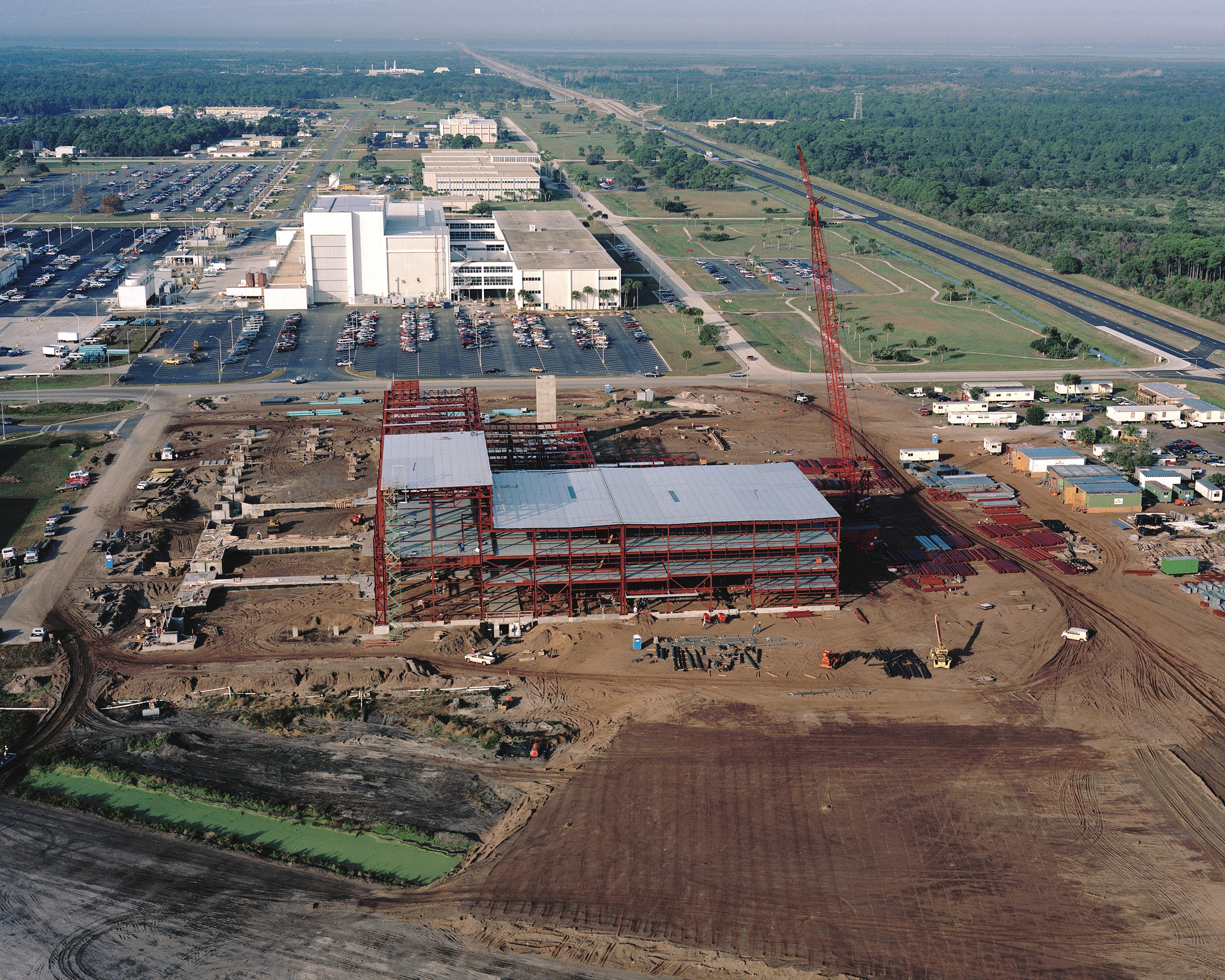
The Space Station Processing Facility under construction in December 1991. Structural steel beams, and the Neil Armstrong Building are visible in the background.

During the re-designing phase of Space Station Freedom in early 1991, Congress approved new plans for NASA to lead the project and begin manufacturing its components for the future International Space Station. Kennedy Space Center was selected as the ideal launch processing complex for the ISS, as well as hosting all the internationally manufactured modules and station elements.

However the Operations and Checkout Building (which was originally to be the prime factory for station launch processing) was insufficient in size to accommodate all the components. On March 26, 1991, engineers at Kennedy Space Center; along with contractor Metric Constructions Inc. of Tampa Florida, broke ground on a new $56 million Space Station Processing Facility, situated adjacent to the O&C. The design called for a 457,000-square-foot multifunction building housing an enormous processing bay, laboratories, control rooms, staging areas, communications and control facilities, and office space for some 1,400 NASA and contractor employees.

KSC Deputy Director Gene Thomas described the construction: "The skyline around here is really going to change. This will be the biggest facility that we have built since the Apollo days". The SSPF used reinforced concrete and some 4,300 tons of steel. The building was structurally completed and topped out by mid 1992.

After three years of construction, interior fitting and equipment set-up, the SSPF formally opened on June 23, 1994.

Into the 21st century, more commercial partners began using the SSPF for projects unrelated to the ISS. In addition, after the announcement of discontinuing ISS operations beyond 2030 (leading to its planned de-orbit in 2031), the SSPF increasingly became a space for general space systems rather than specifically tailoring to the ISS. Due to these reasons, in December 2023, the facility was renamed from the Space Station Processing Facility to the Space Systems Processing Facility, keeping the same acronym.

== Operations and manufacturing processes ==
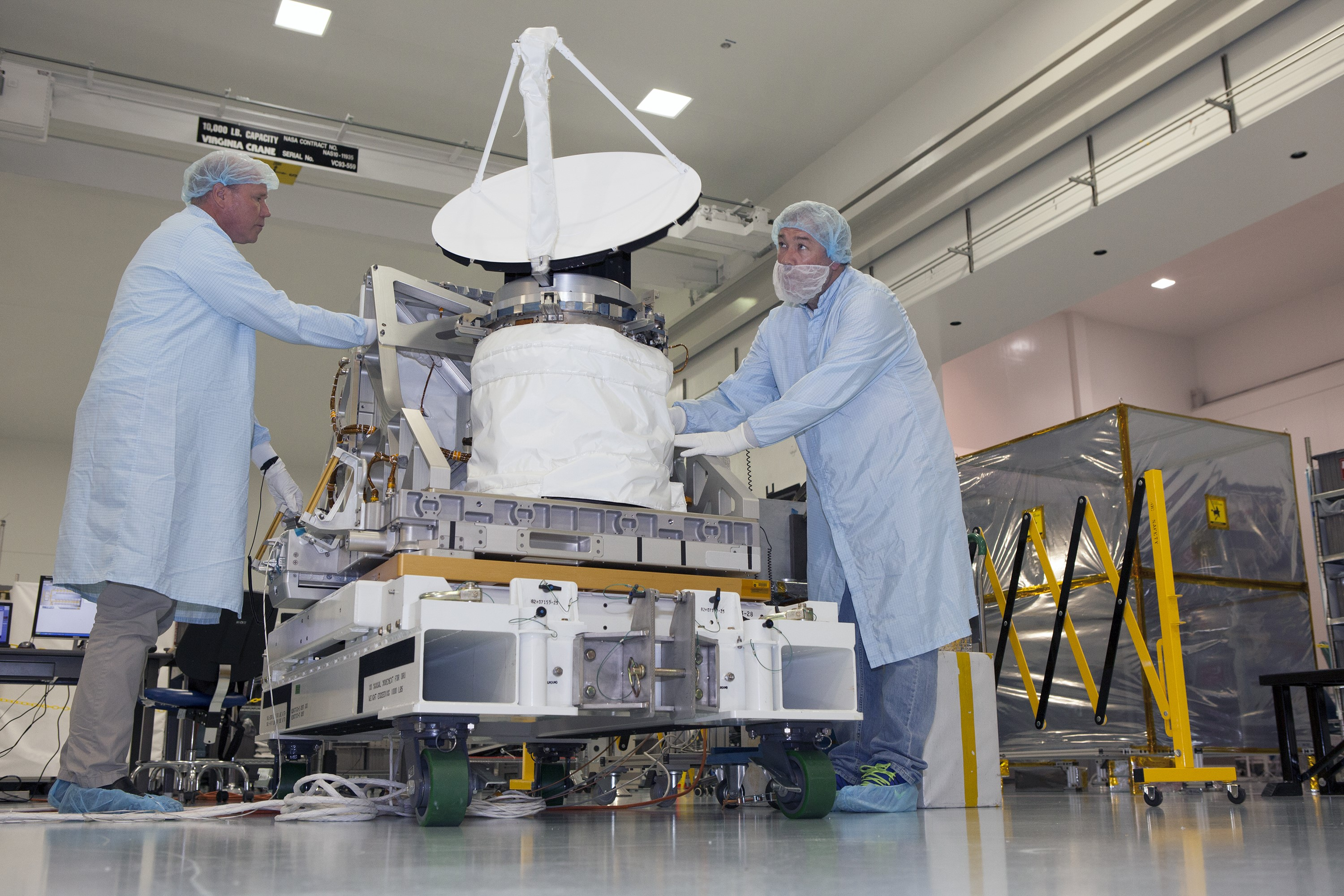
Technicians checking out and testing the ISS RapidScat antenna dish in the low bay area

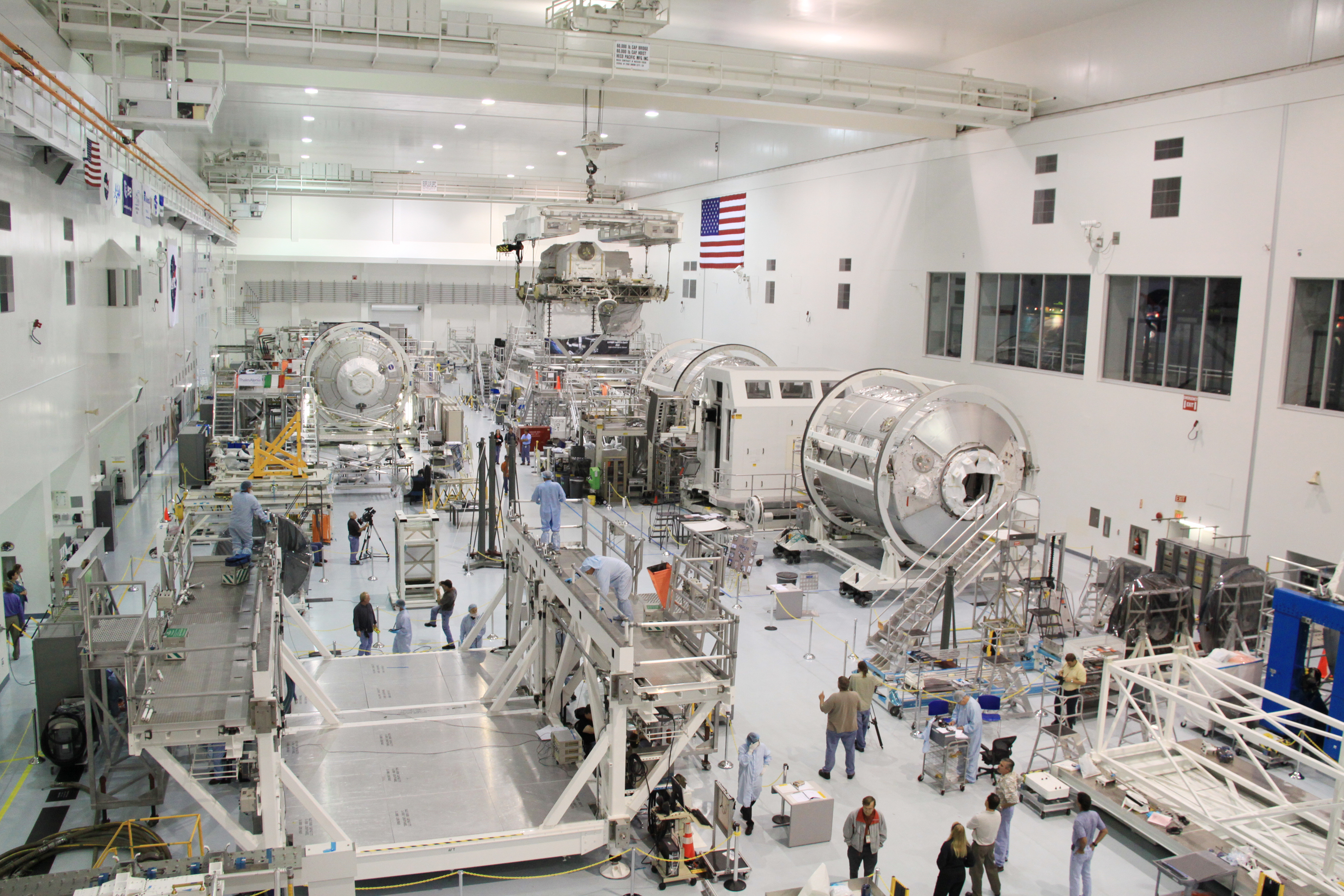
Space Station workstations and engineers in the high bay area

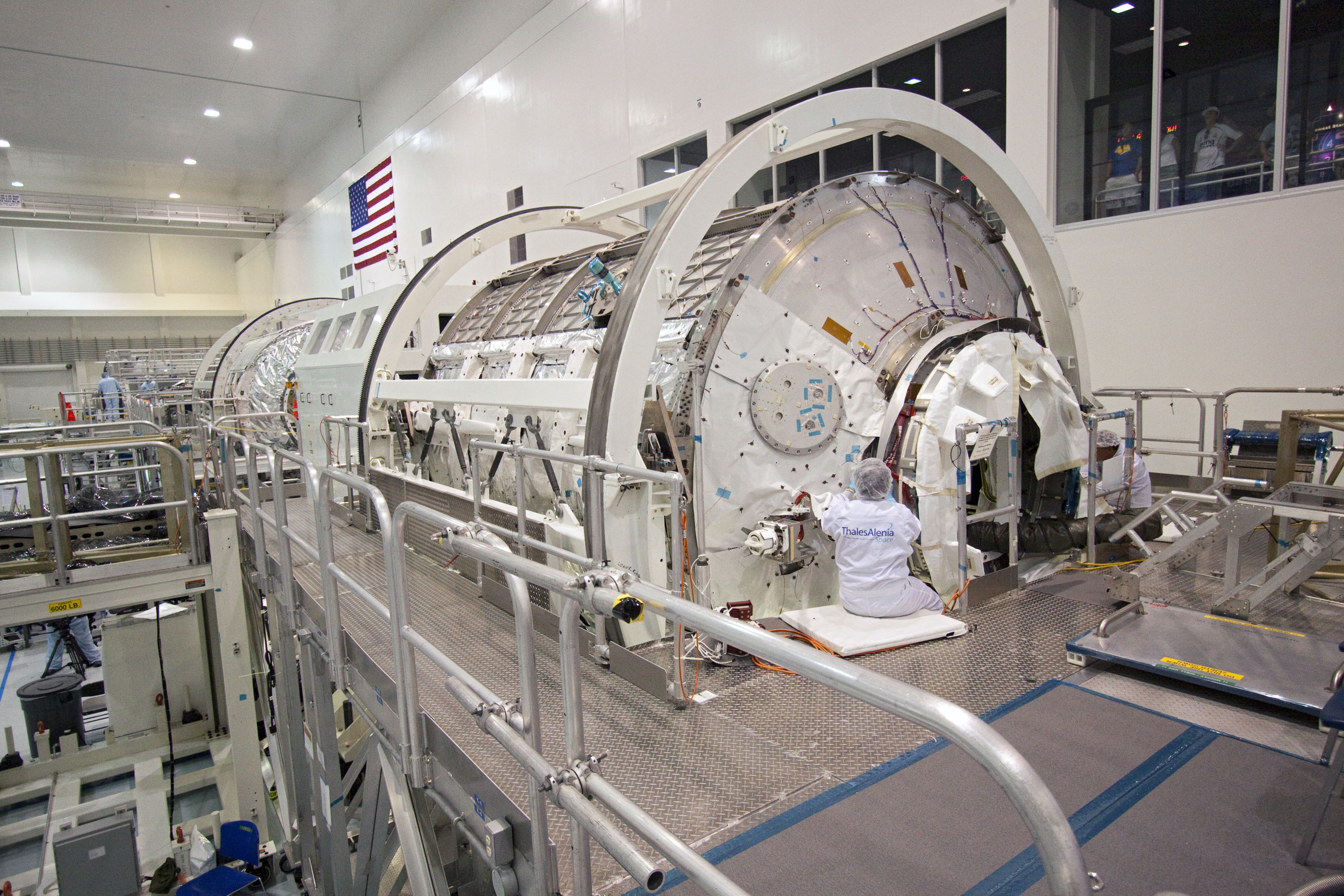
STS-133 MPLM in its workstand, while visitors observe the area from the observation windows

At the SSPF, space station modules, trusses and solar arrays are prepped and made ready for launch. The low and high bays are fully air conditioned and ambient temperature is maintained at 12 °C (54 °F) at all times. Workers and engineers wear full non-contaminant clothing while working. Modules receive cleaning and polishing, and some areas are temporarily disassembled for the installation of cables, electrical systems and plumbing. In another area, shipments of spare materials are available for installation. International Standard Payload Rack frames are assembled and welded together, allowing the installation of instruments, machines and allowing science experiment boxes to be fitted. Once racks are fully assembled, they are hoisted by a special manually operated robotic crane and carefully maneuvered into place inside the space station modules. Each rack weighs from 700 to 1,100 kg, and connect inside the module on special mounts with screws and latches.

Cargo bags for MPLM modules are filled with their cargo such as food packages, science experiments and other miscellaneous items on-site in the SSPF, and loaded into the module by the same robotic crane and strapped in securely.

Many of the builders accompanied their modules from around the world during their manufacturing, and worked at KSC for months to years during final assembly. Many ISS modules were renamed after successfully launching.

=== Station Integration Testing ===
Regarding the launch of modules of the International Space Station (ISS), there had been philosophical differences for years between designers and payload processors whether to ship-and-shoot or perform integration testing prior to launch. The former involved building a station module and launching it without ever physically testing it with other modules. The integration testing was not originally in the ISS plan, but in 1995 Johnson Space Center designers began to consider it and embedding KSC personnel at module factories. Multi-Element Integration Testing (MEIT) of ISS modules at KSC was officially in the books in 1997.

Three MEIT and one Integration Systems Test (IST) tests were conducted for the ISS, taking about three years from planning to completion and closure:

- MEIT1: US Lab, Z1 truss, P6 truss, and a Node 1 emulator
  - Planning began in 1997, Testing began January 1999
- MEIT2: S0 truss/Mobile Transporter/Mobile Base System, S1 truss, P1 truss, P3 truss, P4 truss, and a US Lab emulator.
- MEIT3: Japanese Experiment Module, Node 2, and the US Lab emulator
  - Completed in 2007
- Node2 IST: Node 2 and US Lab and Node 1 emulators, as part of the ISS Flight Emulator

After the launch of the Destiny, an emulator was built for MEIT testing, since the lab controlled many other modules. Among the items checked were mechanical connections, the ability to flow power and fluids between modules, and the flight software.

Numerous issues were found and rectified from these on the ground tests, many of which could not have been fixed in orbit.

== Building specifications ==
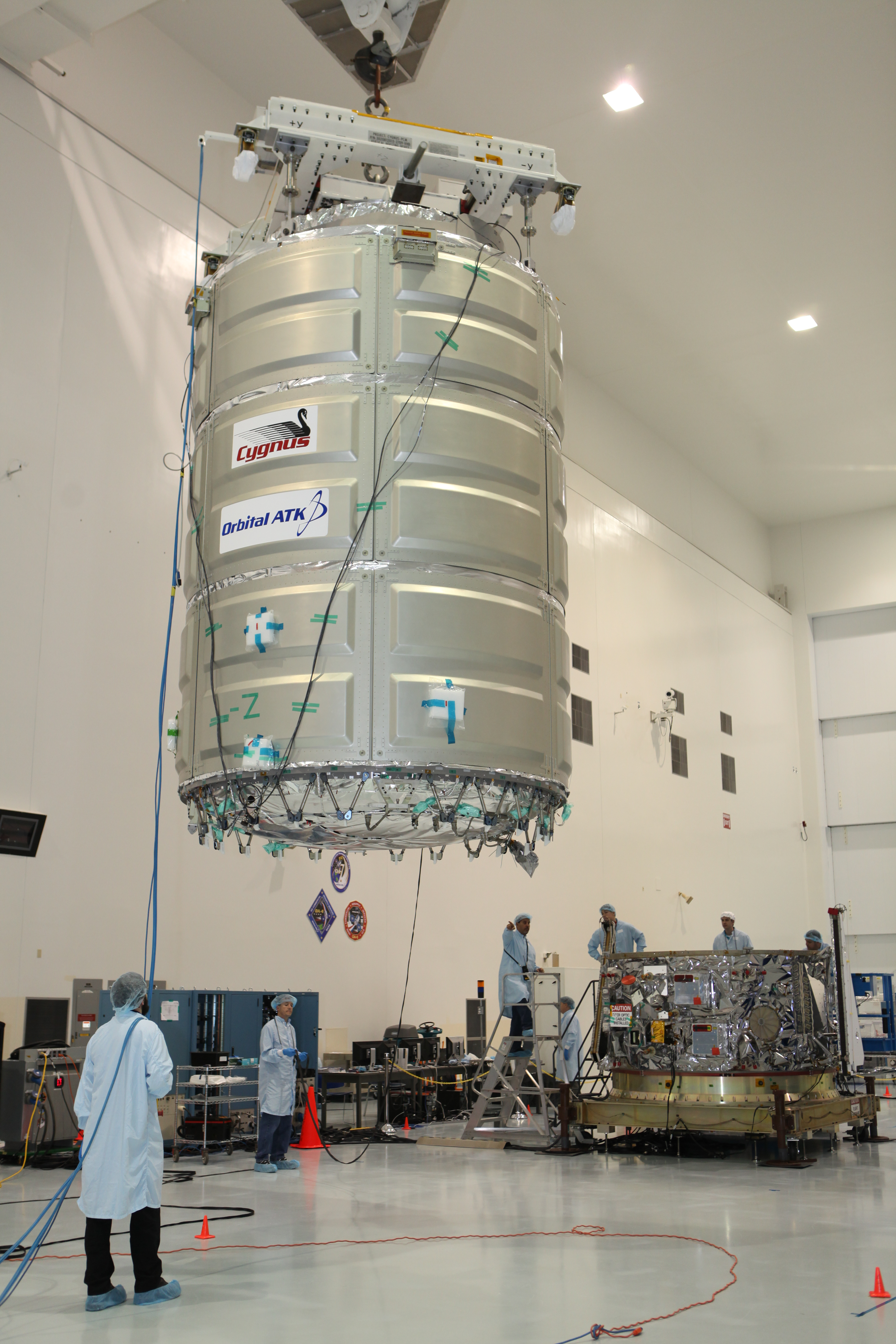
A Cygnus spacecraft being moved by overhead cranes to another work area in the high bay. Note the ceiling height in comparison to the engineers.

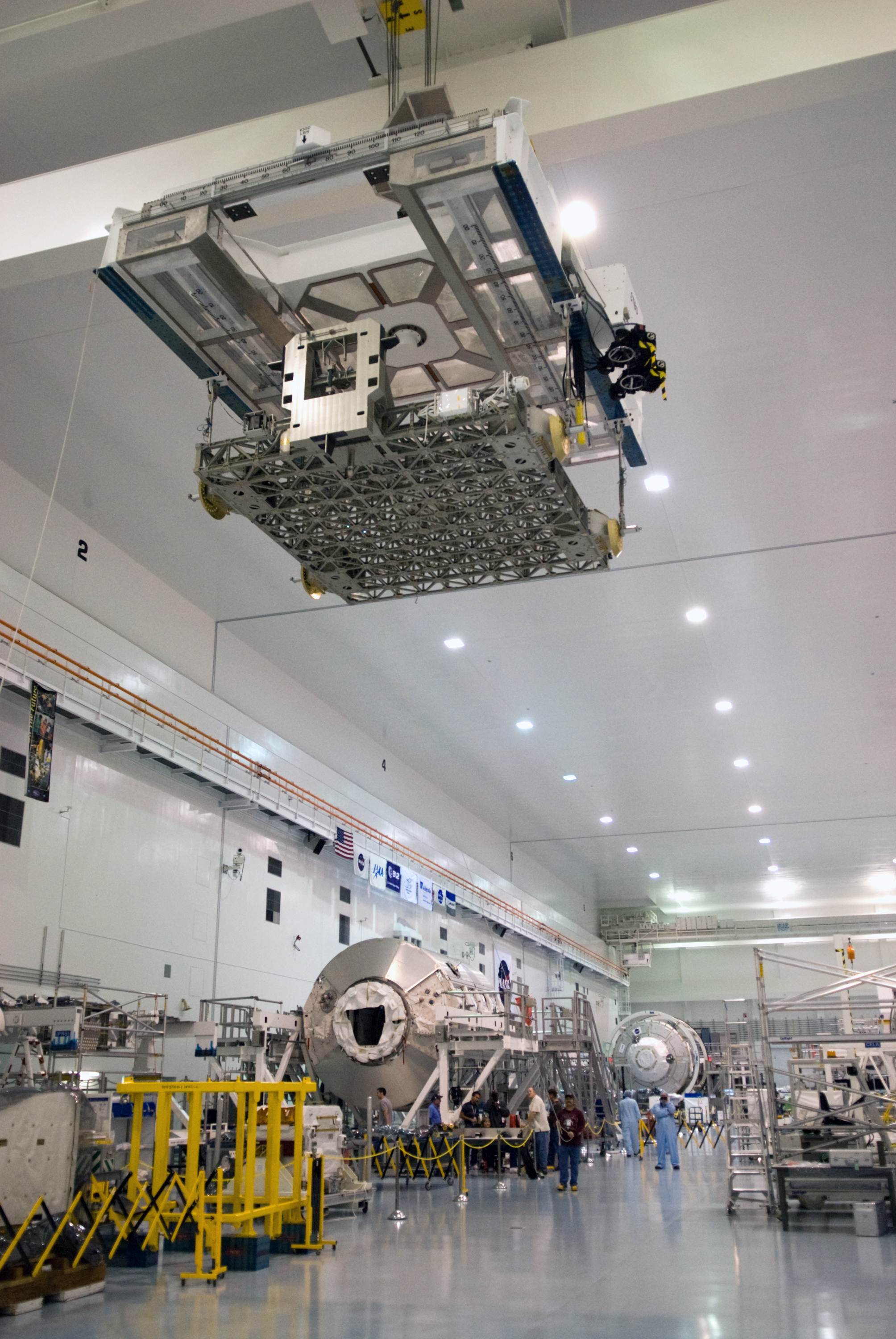
ExPRESS Logistics Carrier no.3 for STS-134

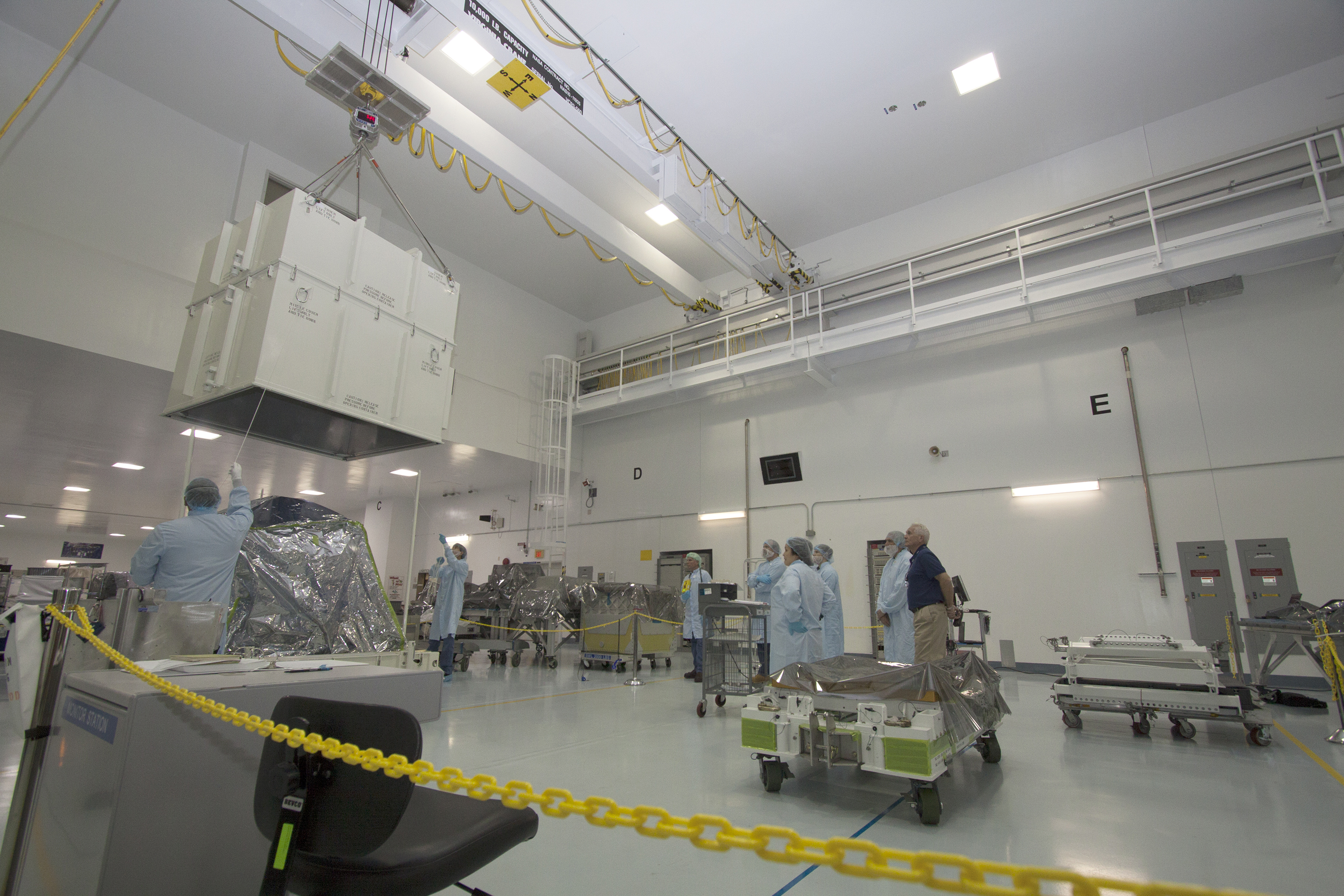
The I-bay area

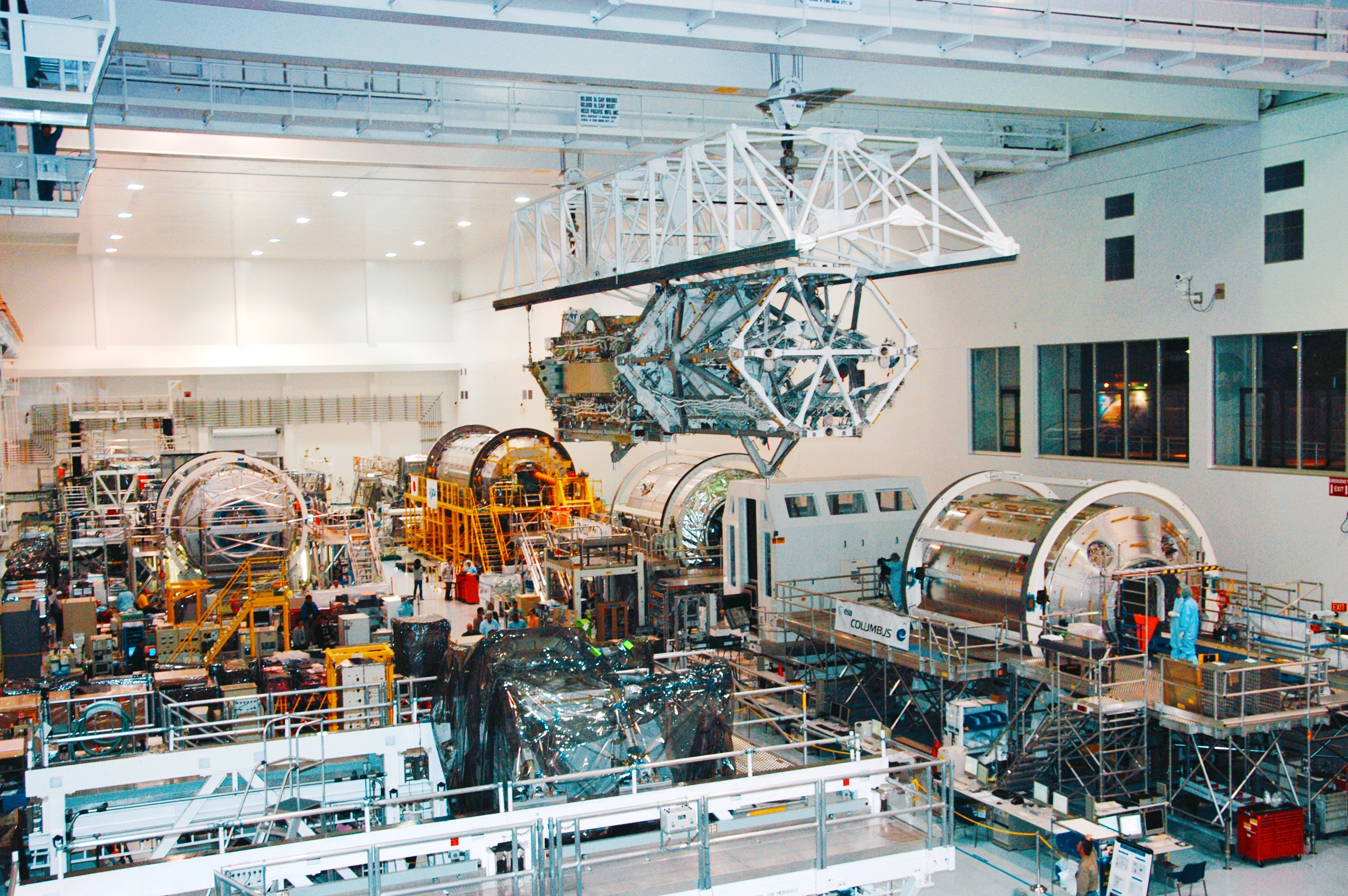
S3-S4 Truss being hoist to the payload transfer container

The SSPF's High Bays support the manufacturing, assembly, testing and processing of payloads and components destined for space. The High Bays are large cleanrooms equipped with overhead cranes, utility service equipment and a secure backup-power supply. The facility also has 15 offline laboratories.

=== Intermediate Bay (I-bay) ===
- Dimensions: 338 ft (103 m) in length, by 50 ft (15 m) in width
- Ceiling height 30 ft (9.1 m)
- 100,000-class clean work area

=== High Bay ===
- Dimensions 472 ft (144 m) in length, by 121 ft (37 m) in Width
- Ceiling height 69 ft (21 m)
- Can be separated into eight different processing areas

=== Cranes ===
- I-bay: Two 5,000 kg (11,000 lb) capacity
- High Bay: Two 30,000 kg (66,000 lb) capacity

=== Commodities and Servicing Equipment ===
- Ammonia servicing machines
- Compressed air supply (125 psi)
- Potable water pipes

=== Electrical Services ===
- 480 V 3-phase power at 60 Hz
- Uninterruptible power supply (450 kVA)

=== Laboratory facilities ===
- 9 independently operated control rooms
- 15 labs, 2 chemical labs, and 2 darkrooms
- 1 Certified offline lab for planetary protection processing (Class-100 clean work area)
- 3 ISS Environmental Simulator (ISSES) Chambers, can be used to expose ISS life science ground controls to ISS environmental conditions (i.e., temperature, humidity).
- Experiment Monitoring Area (EMA), used to monitor ISS life science experiments

Office floor area: 140,000 ft^{2} (13,000 m^{2}) of office/work space

== Space Station and space hardware components currently in the SSPF ==
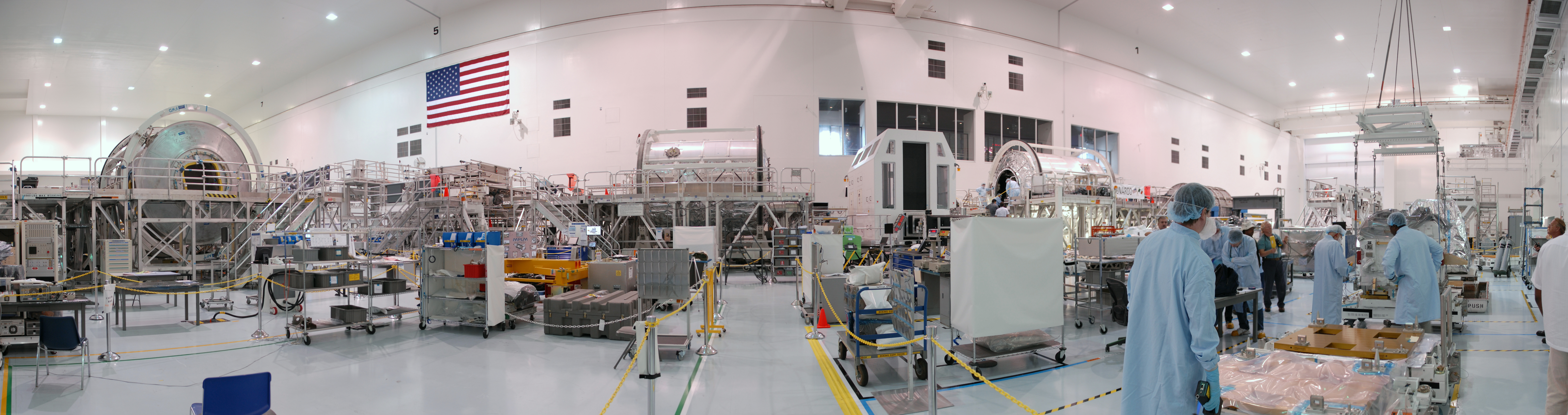
A panorama view of the high bay area in August 2010. Note the lights sometimes tend to change color from pink to gold hues.

As of 24 June 2023:

- Multi-Purpose Logistics Modules Raffaello and Donatello.
- Two Lightweight Multi-Purpose Equipment Support Structure Carriers (LMCs).
- Lunar Gateway habitat module, built by Lockheed Martin - used as a training rig.
- Dream Chaser 'mini space shuttle' - designed and manufactured by Sierra Nevada Corporation.
- Machinery for experiments in the Lunar Gateway
- Bigelow Aerospace inflatable habitat mockup

When the lights in the building are on, most of these components can be seen on the live webcam from the facility.

=== Current and future activities ===
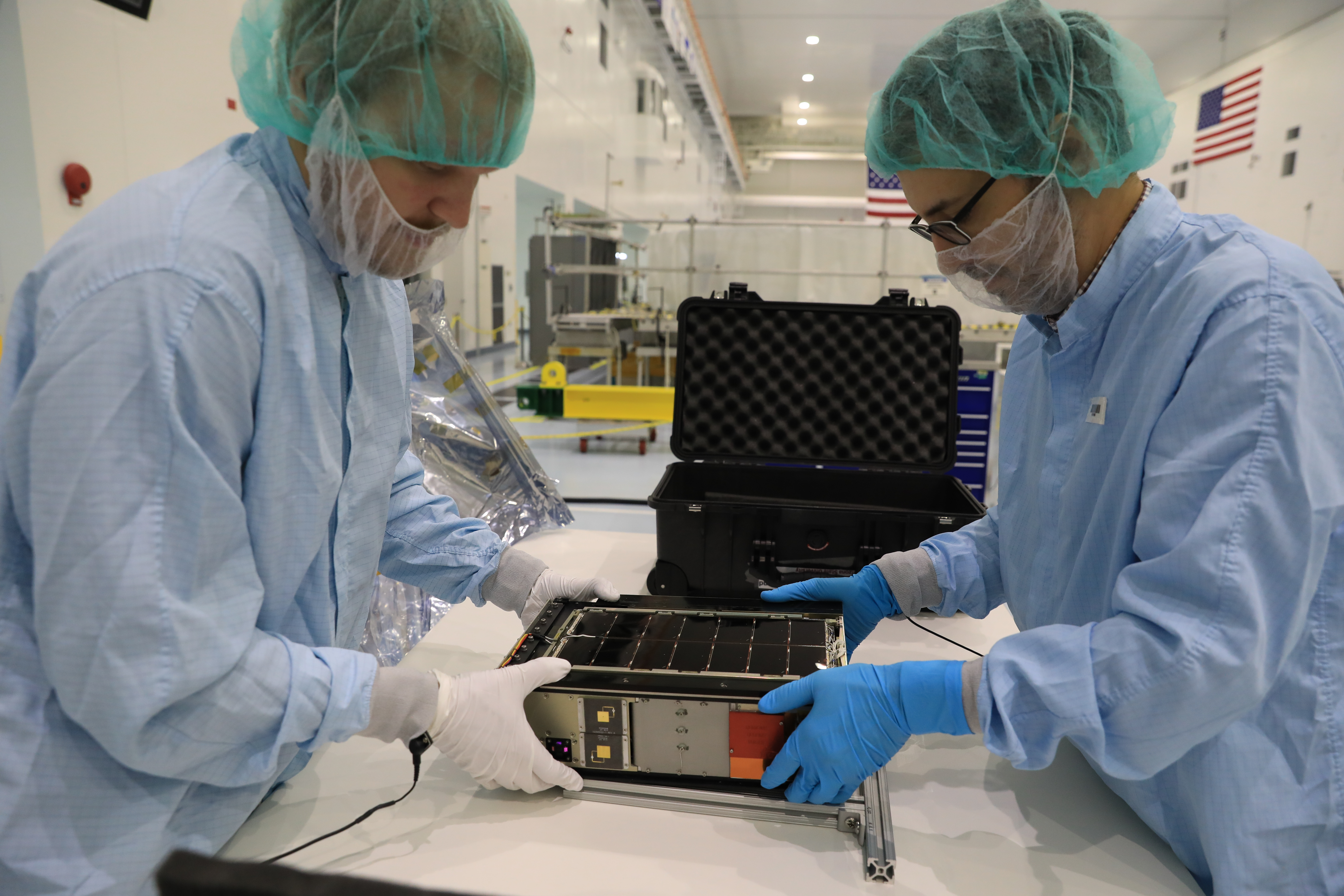
Engineers and students make and prep a LunaH-Map cubesat for Artemis 1 in the SSPF, July 2021.

After the completion of the International Space Station in 2011, the SSPF factory was dormant for several months until early 2012, where the building was slightly refurbished for the moving in of space companies (such as Orbital ATK, SpaceX and eventually Sierra Nevada Corporation) to manufacture, process and load-up Cygnus and Dragon spacecraft and on-board payloads, as part of the Commercial Resupply Services program. NASA's upcoming Artemis mission hardware such as Moon and Mars space station modules and Space Launch System core stage engine sections, as well as the Dream Chaser mini-space shuttle, have begun manufacturing and processing operations in the high bay as of December 2022.

The building itself is open to the public and tours are offered free of charge by the employees. Exclusive tours of many areas of the SSPF are part of the Kennedy visitor complex's enhanced bus tour package.

In 2016, the laboratories of the SSPF were utilized by many small science companies and student unions with scientific equipment to study the feasibility of growing vegetables in space, such as the Veggie plant growth system, and the Advanced Plant Habitat; to launch as scientific payloads to the International Space Station.

== Events ==
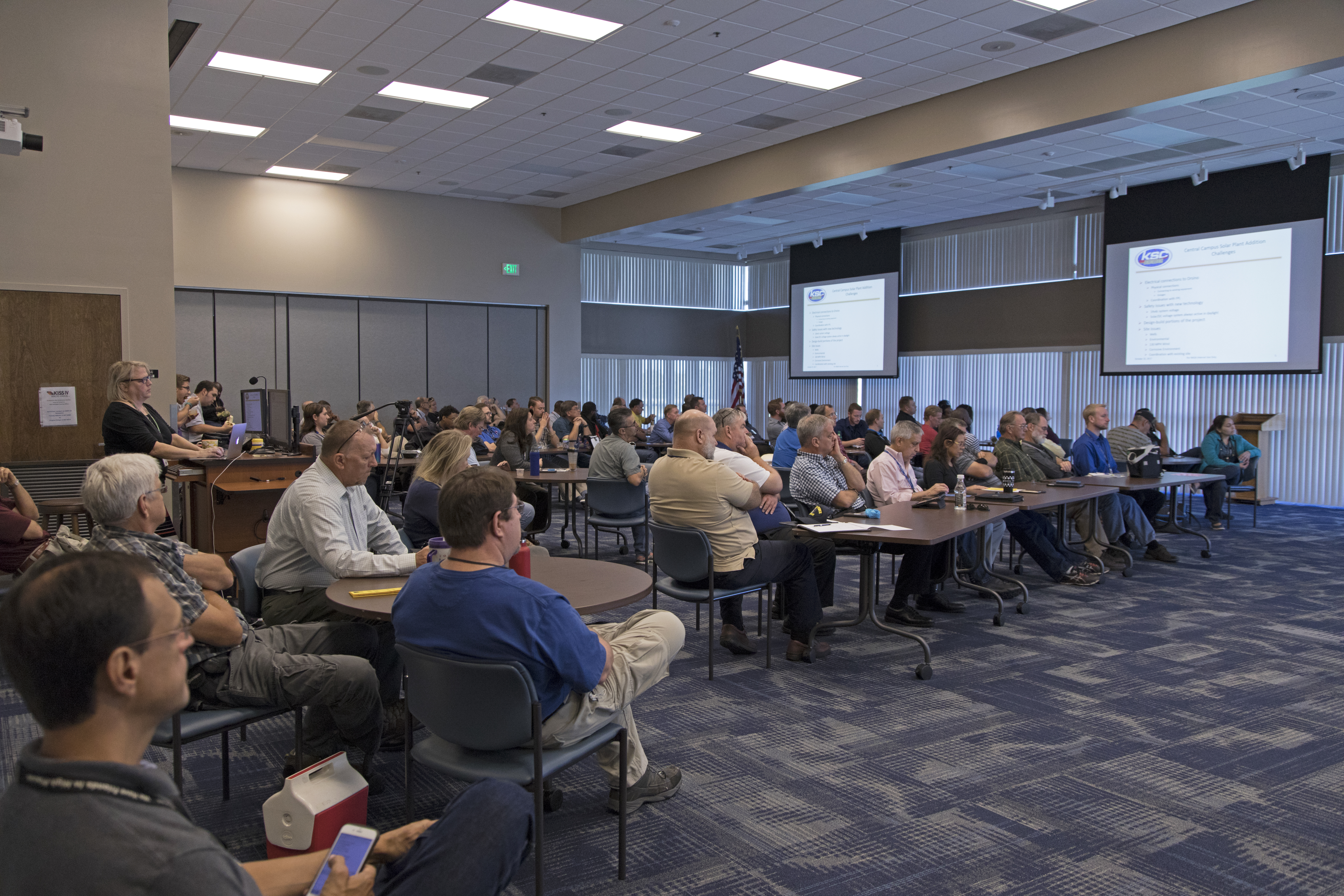
Main ballroom of the SSPF, typically used for NASA lectures and sometimes special dinner events

When the high bay area is less busy at times, a variety of events and conferences are held in various places within the SSPF building. Occasional STEM exhibitions take place where visitors (from children and teenagers to university students) can visit the SSPF and its ballroom to learn about the building's history, manufacturing acitivies, biological and chemical sciences, and the future vision of space operations at Kennedy Space Center, including the Lunar Gateway mockup module. The ballroom also doubles as a lecture hall for presentations. On rare occasions the high bay was once used for the National Space Council's second revived meeting on February 21, 2018.

Tenants including Northrop Grumman, Lockheed Martin and Airbus have also moved facilities into the SSPF.

== Gallery ==
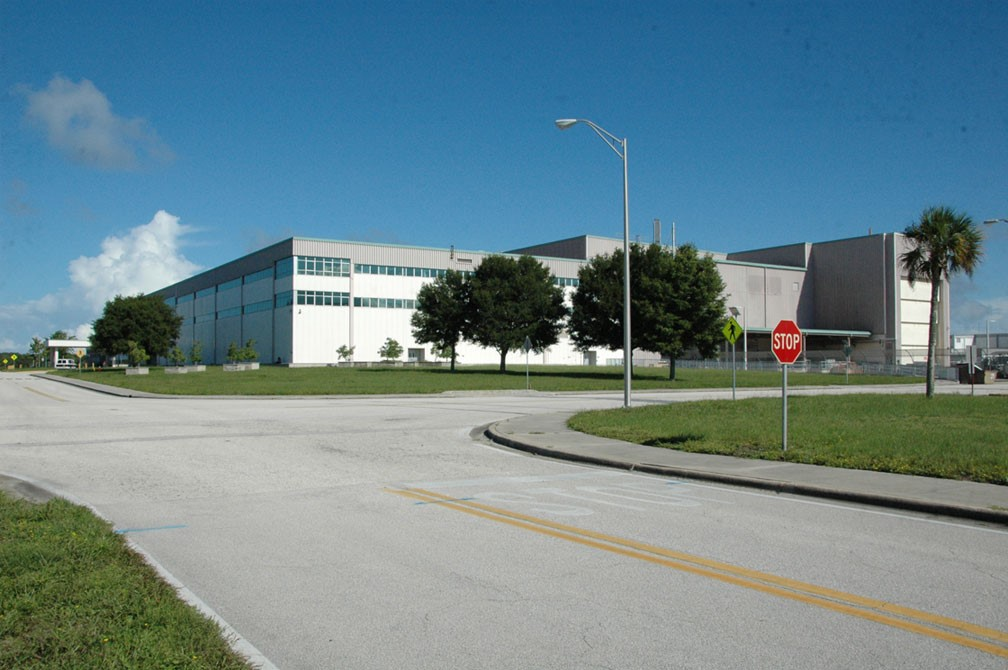
The exterior of the SSPF viewed from NASA Parkway

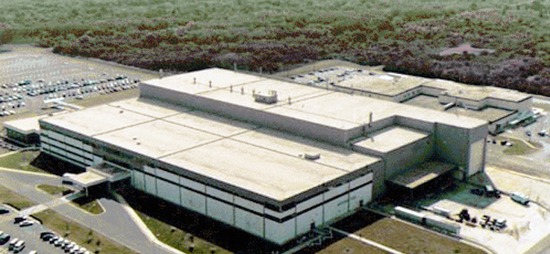
Aerial view of the SSPF in 1995

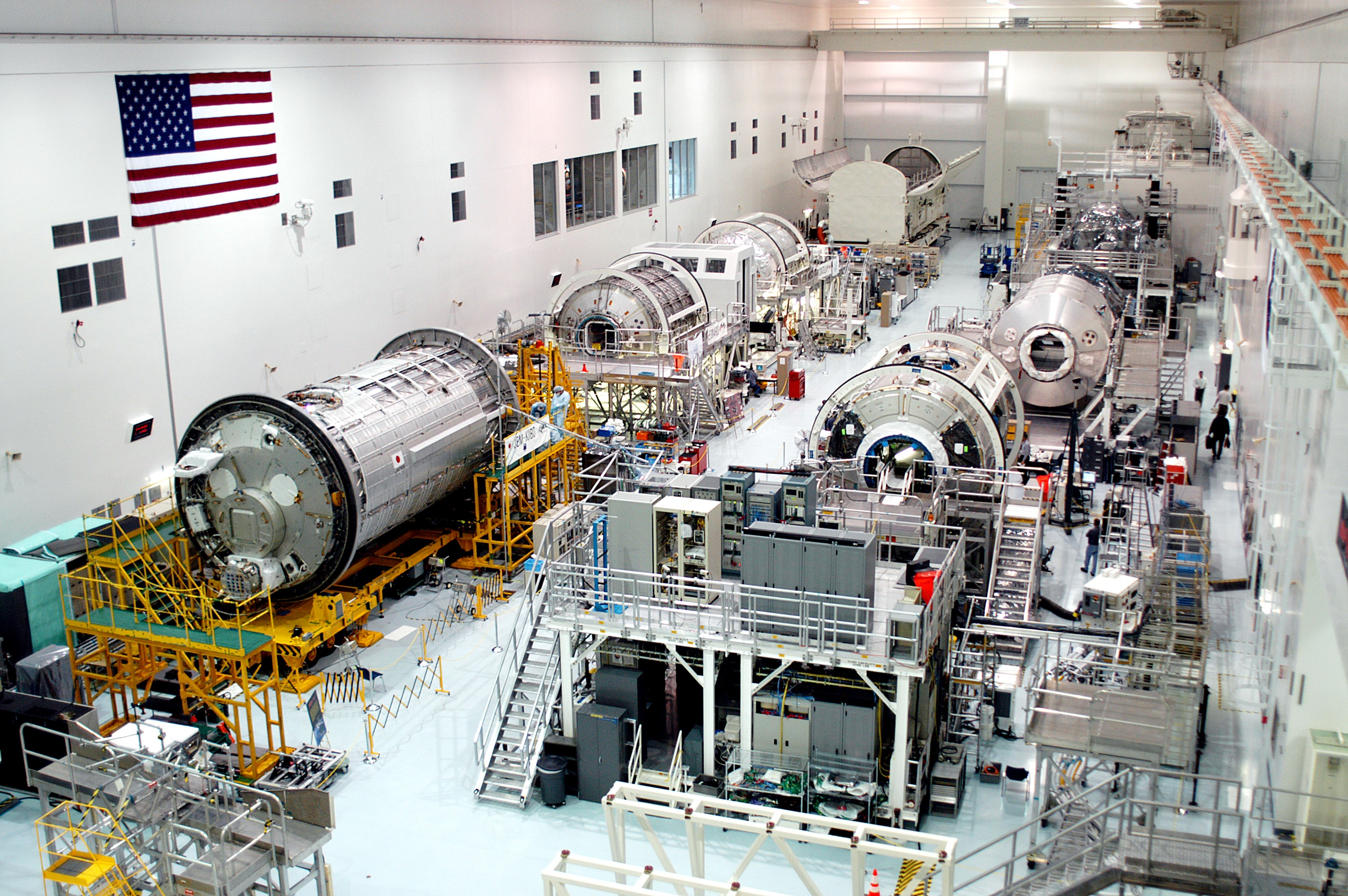
International Space Station modules being manufactured in the SSPF main workshop area

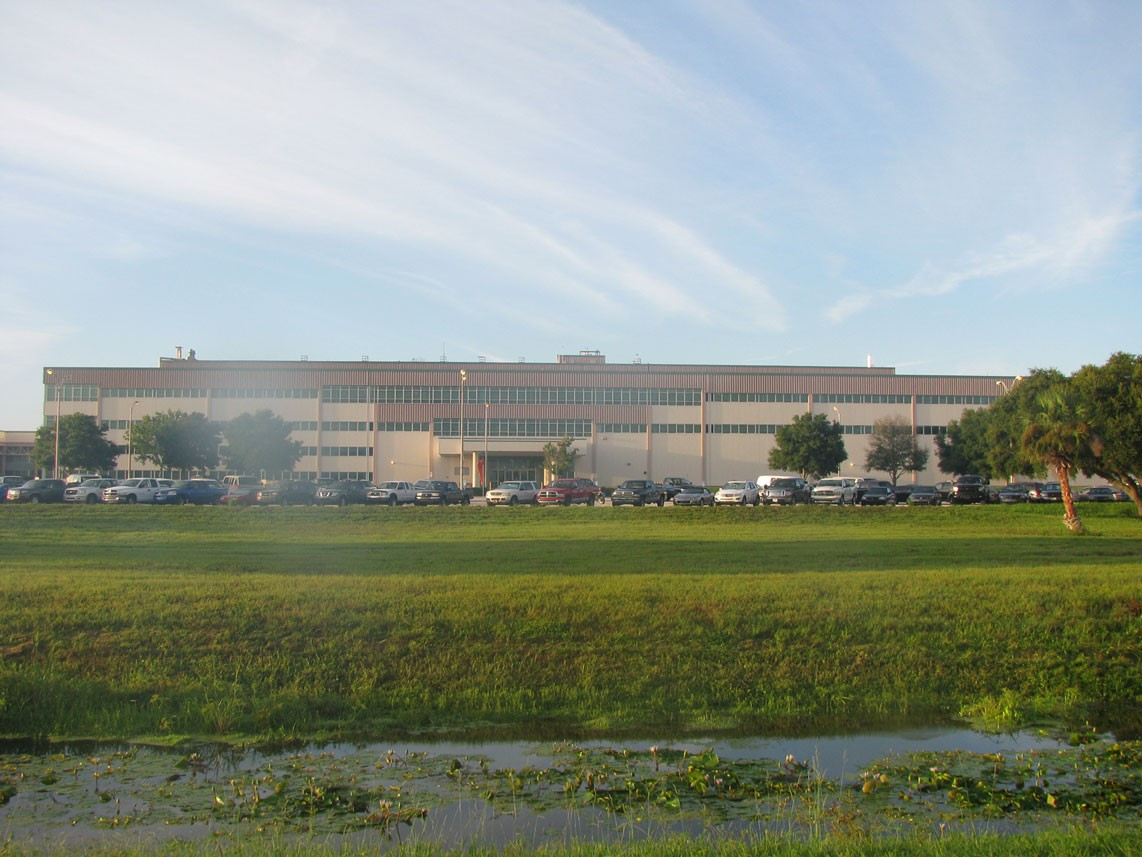
The main entrance to the facility

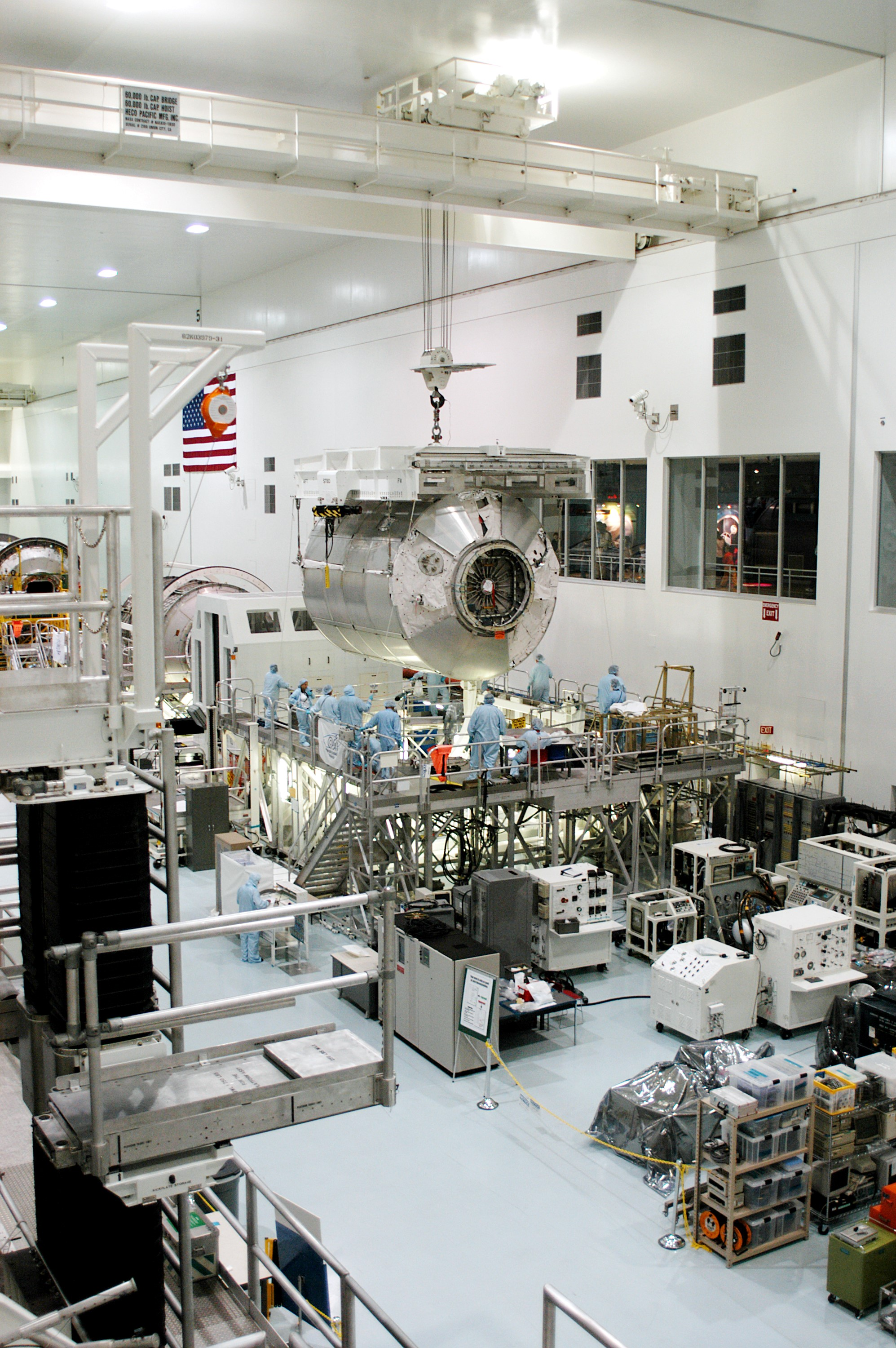
An MPLM being hoisted by overhead cranes

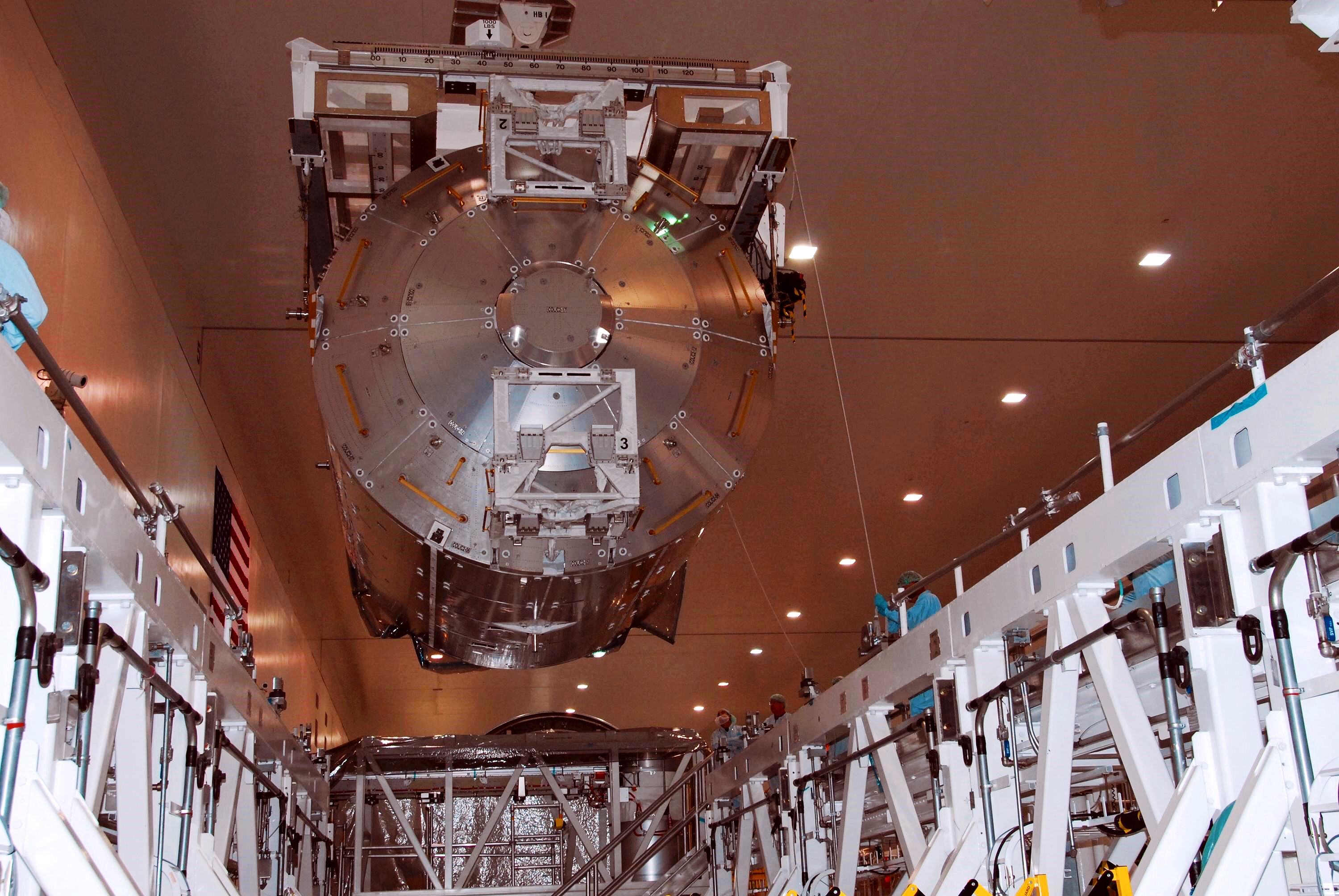
Columbus being moved to a weighing stand before loading in transfer container

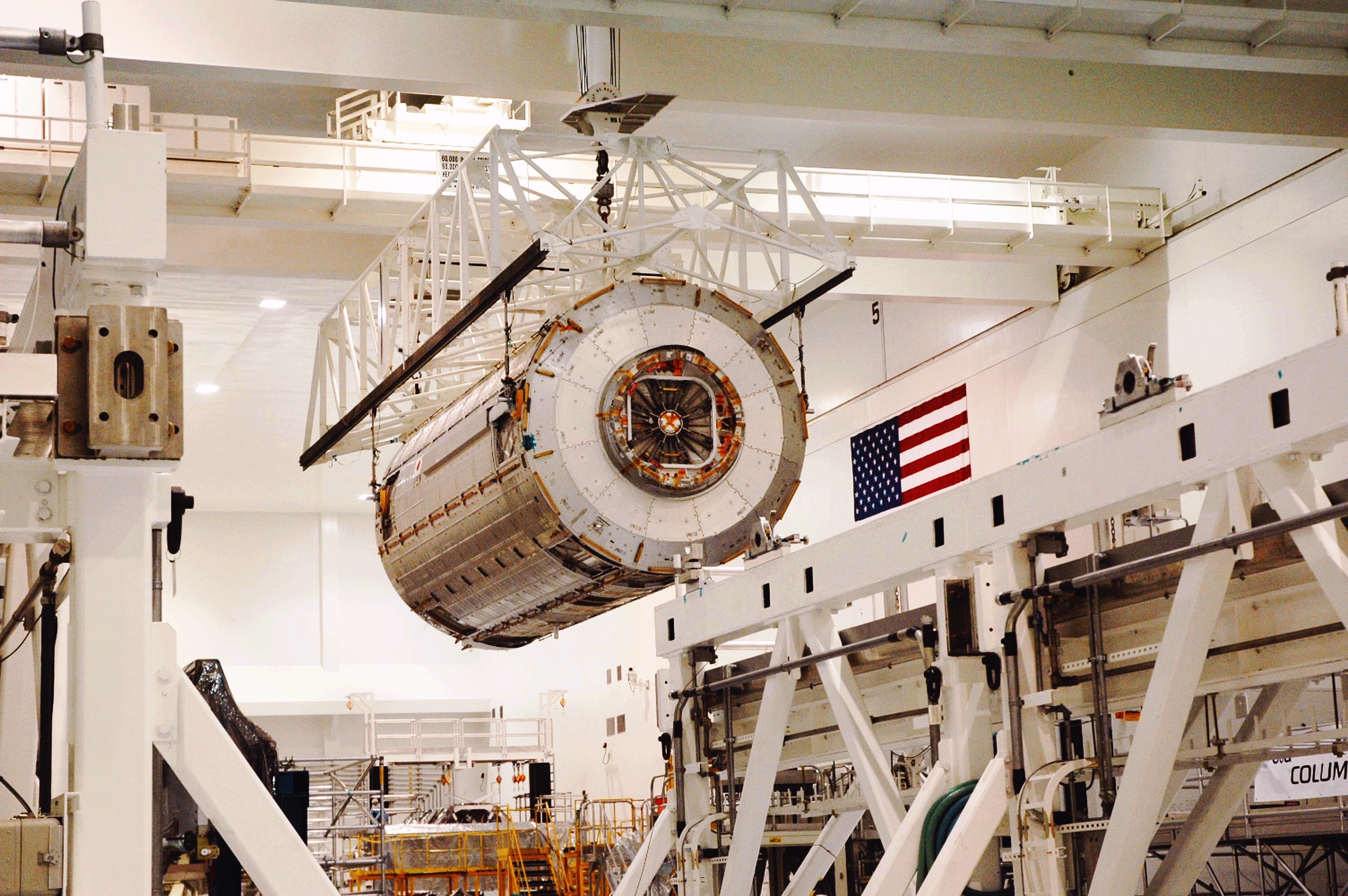
The JEM being hoisted to a manufacturing workstand

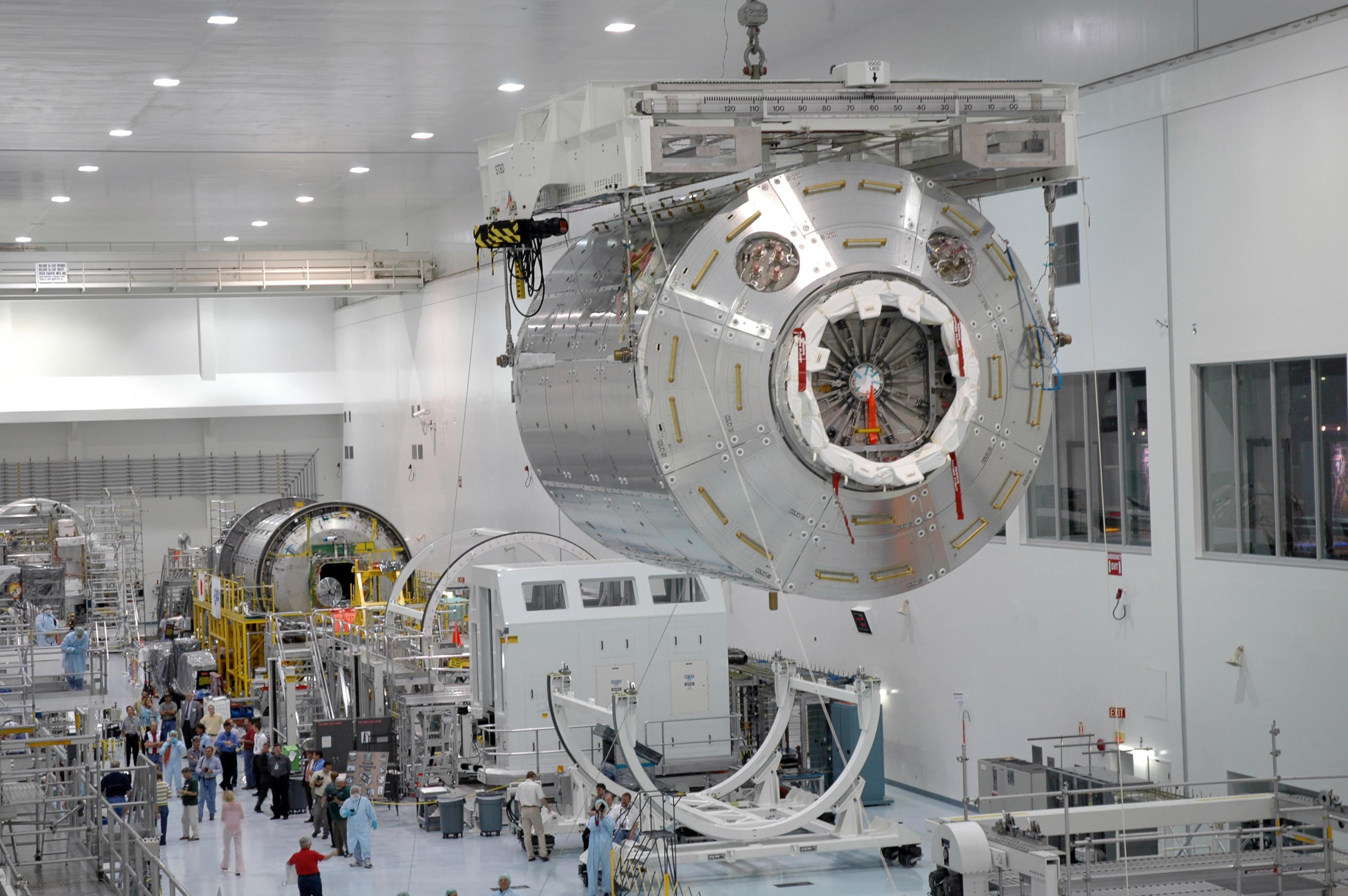
European Space Agency Columbus Module

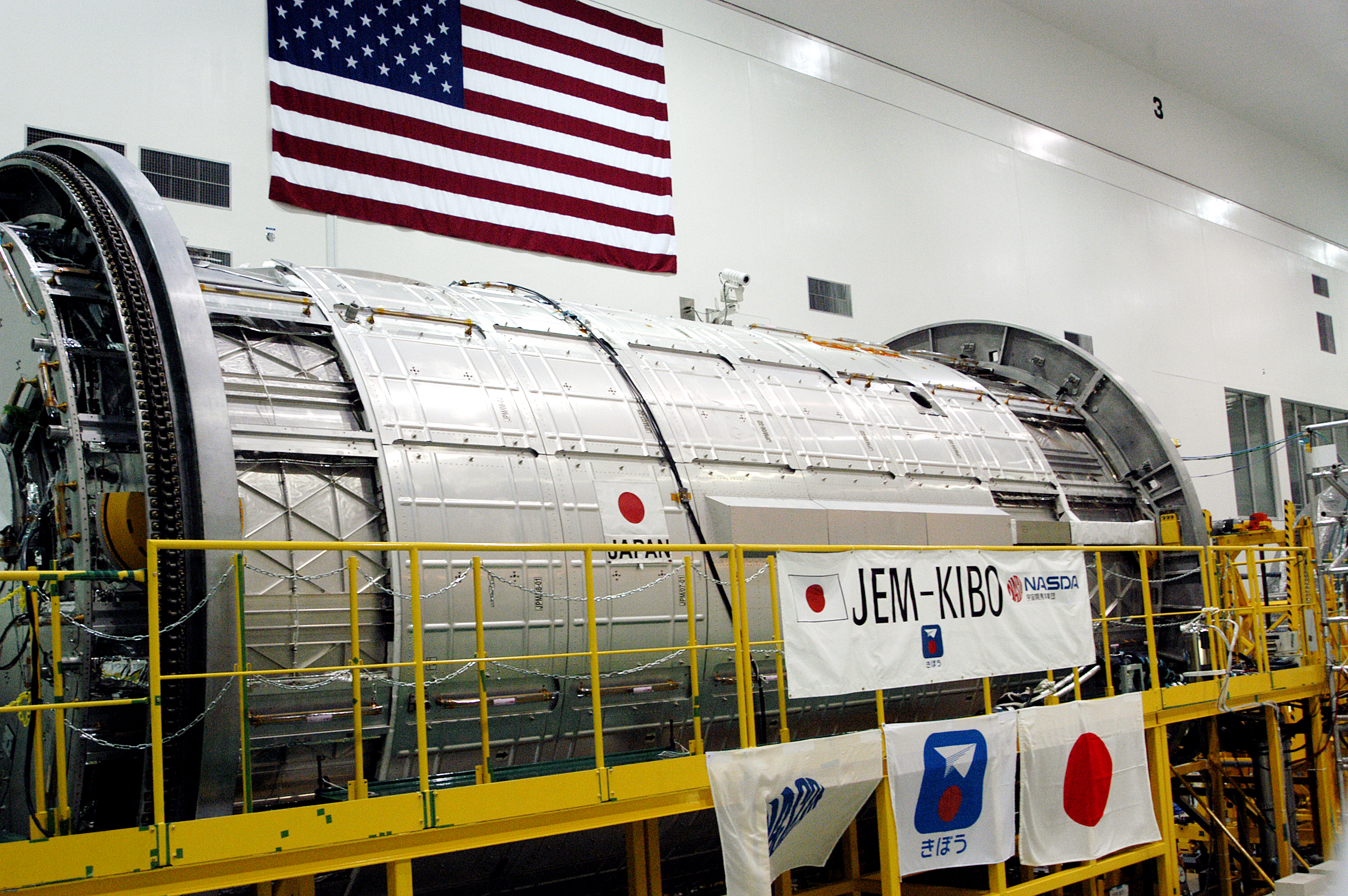
The main Kibo module in its manufacturing workstand, c. 2003

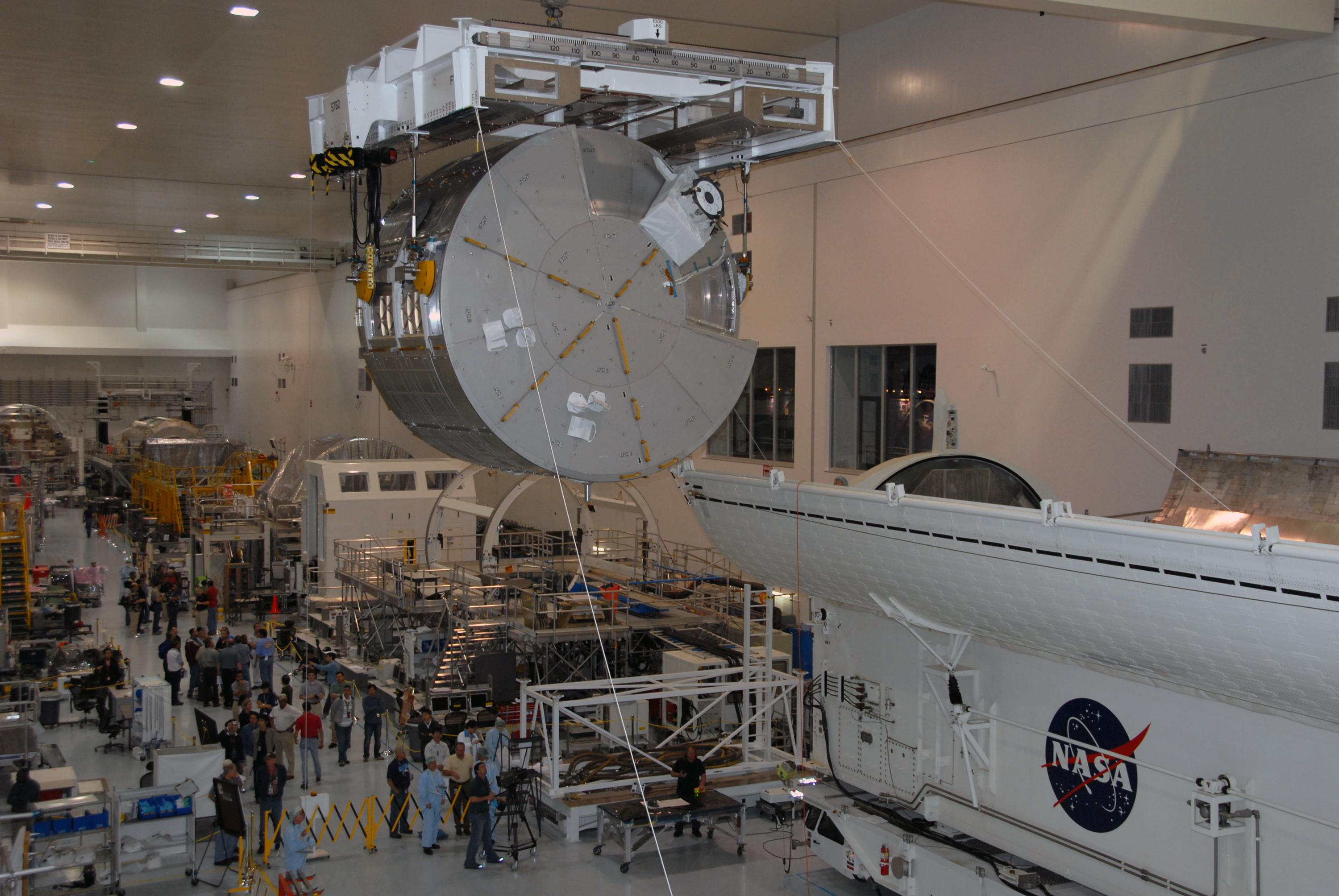
Kibo JLP module transfer to the payload transfer container

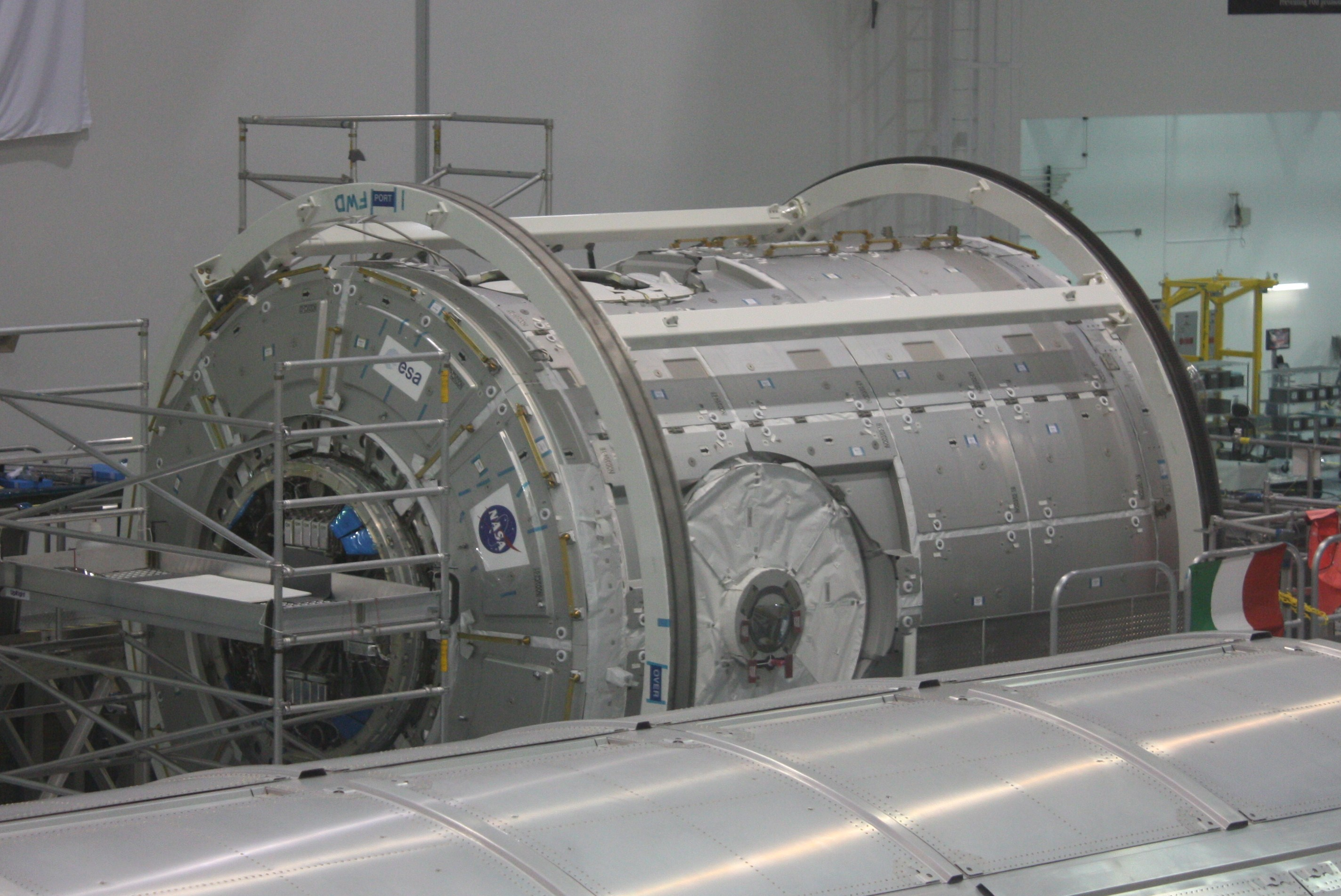
Tranquility in the SSPF.

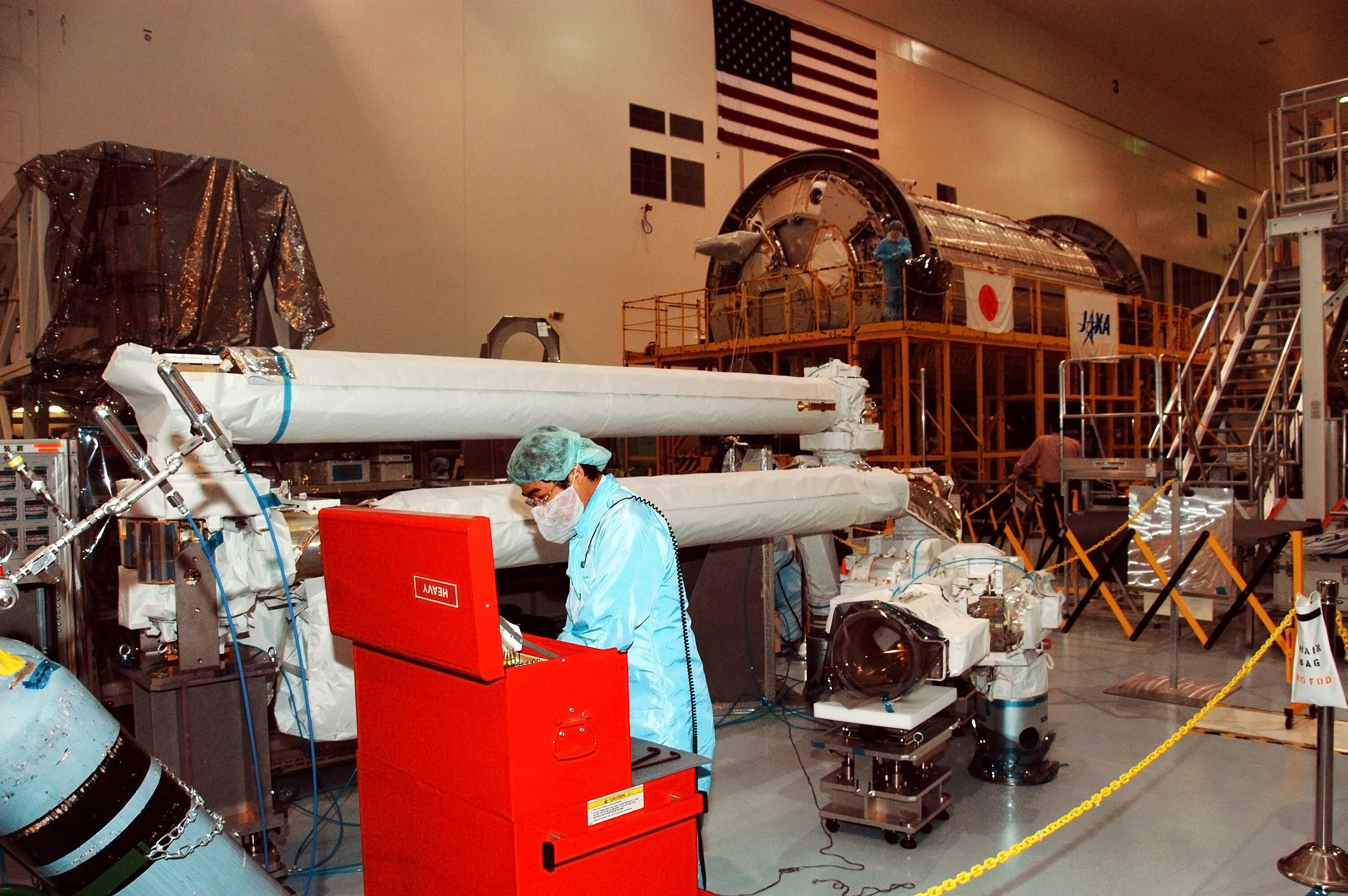
A worker assembles parts for the Japanese Experiment Module remote manipulator arm, under gold light

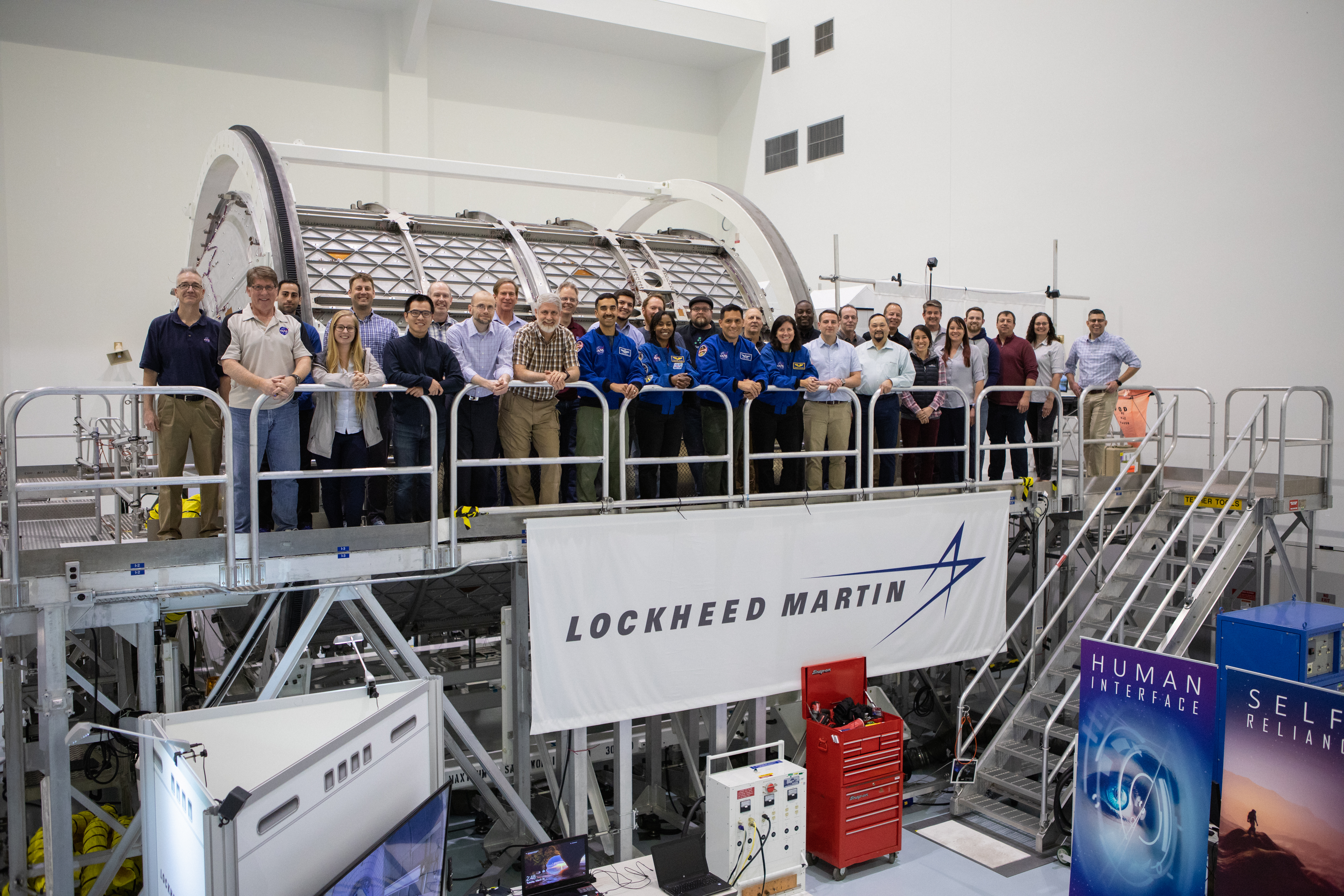
NASA and Lockheed Martin employees group photo with the Lunar Gateway module training mock-up inside the SSPF

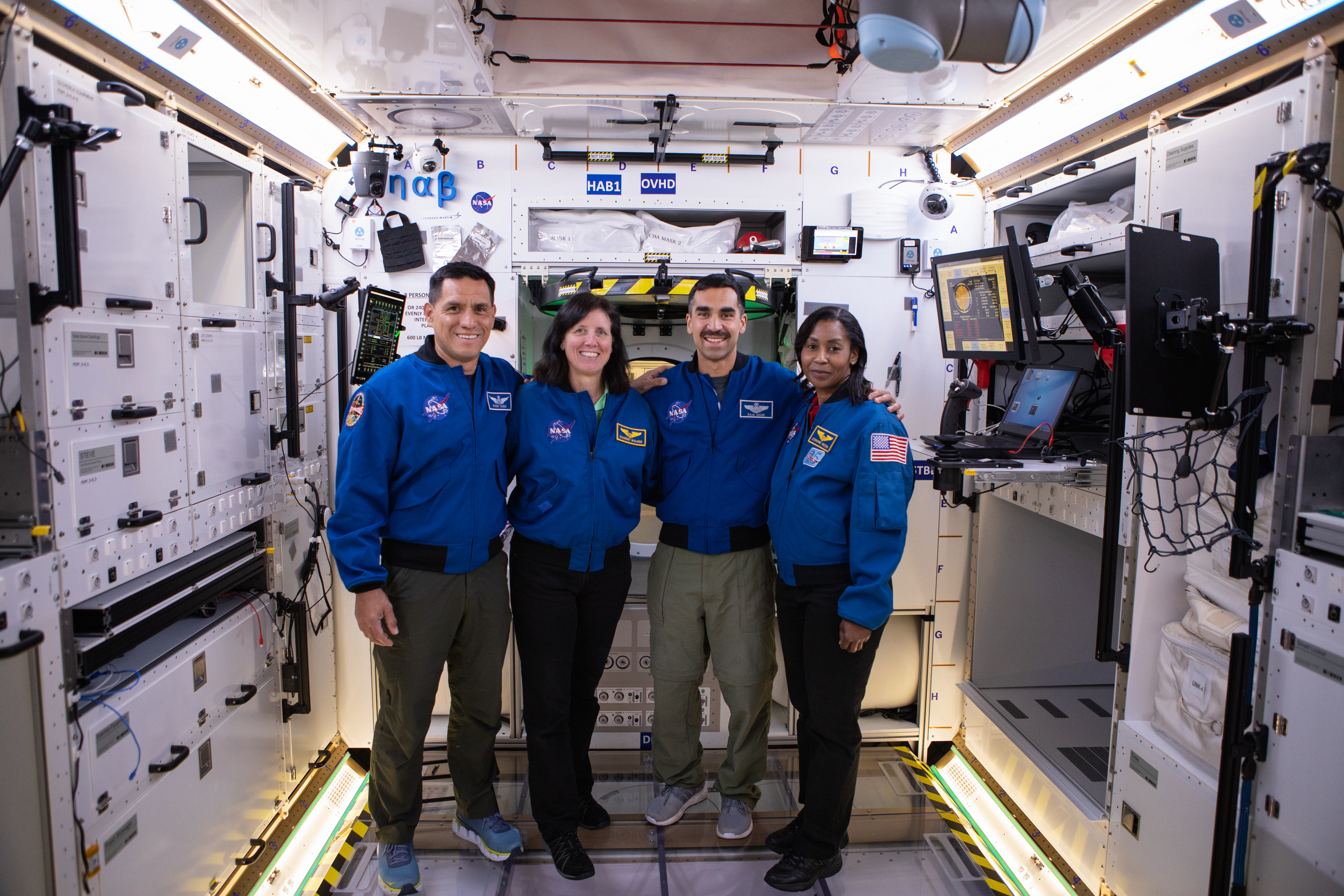
Inside the Lunar Gateway mock-up module, with four astronauts.

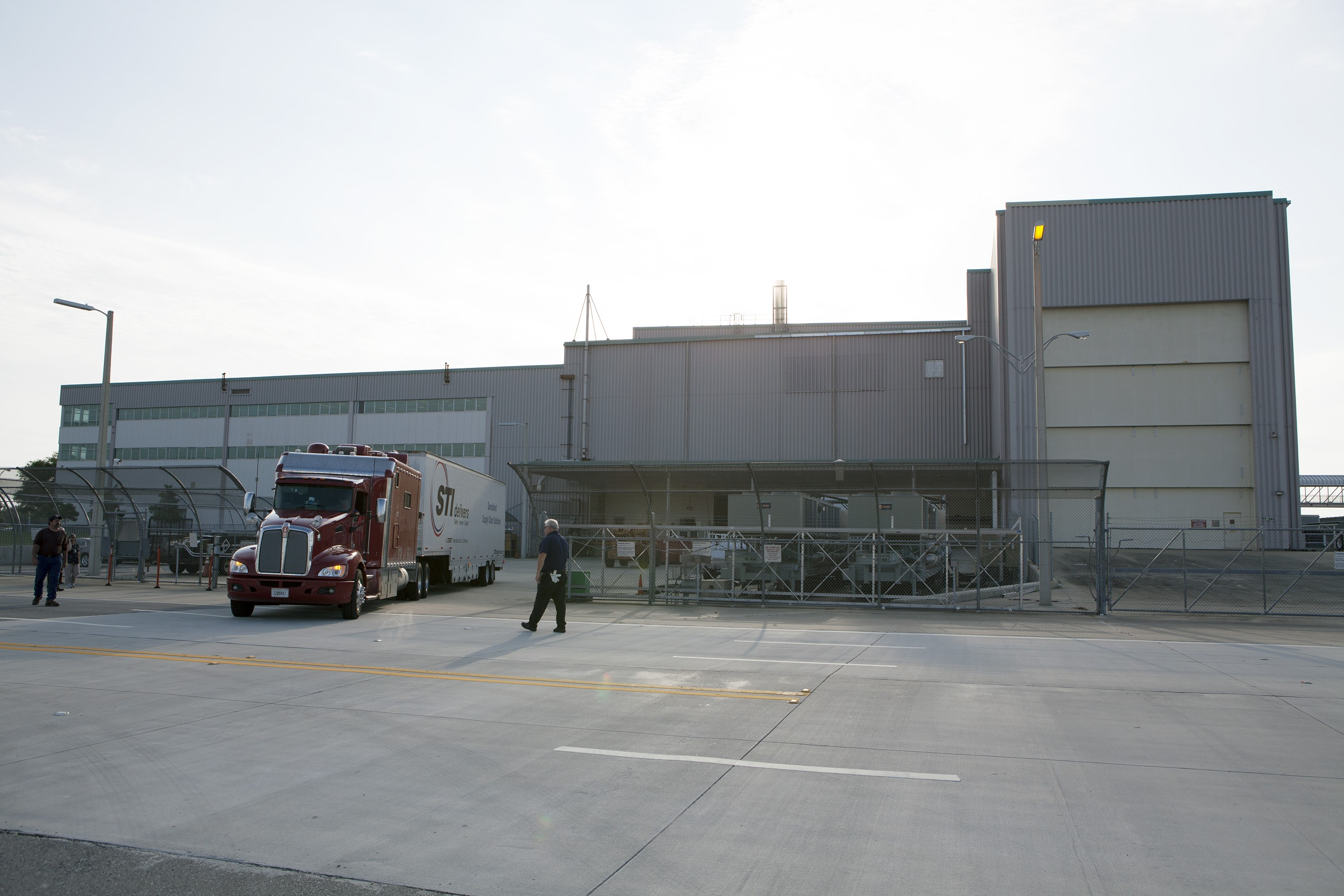
Loading yard

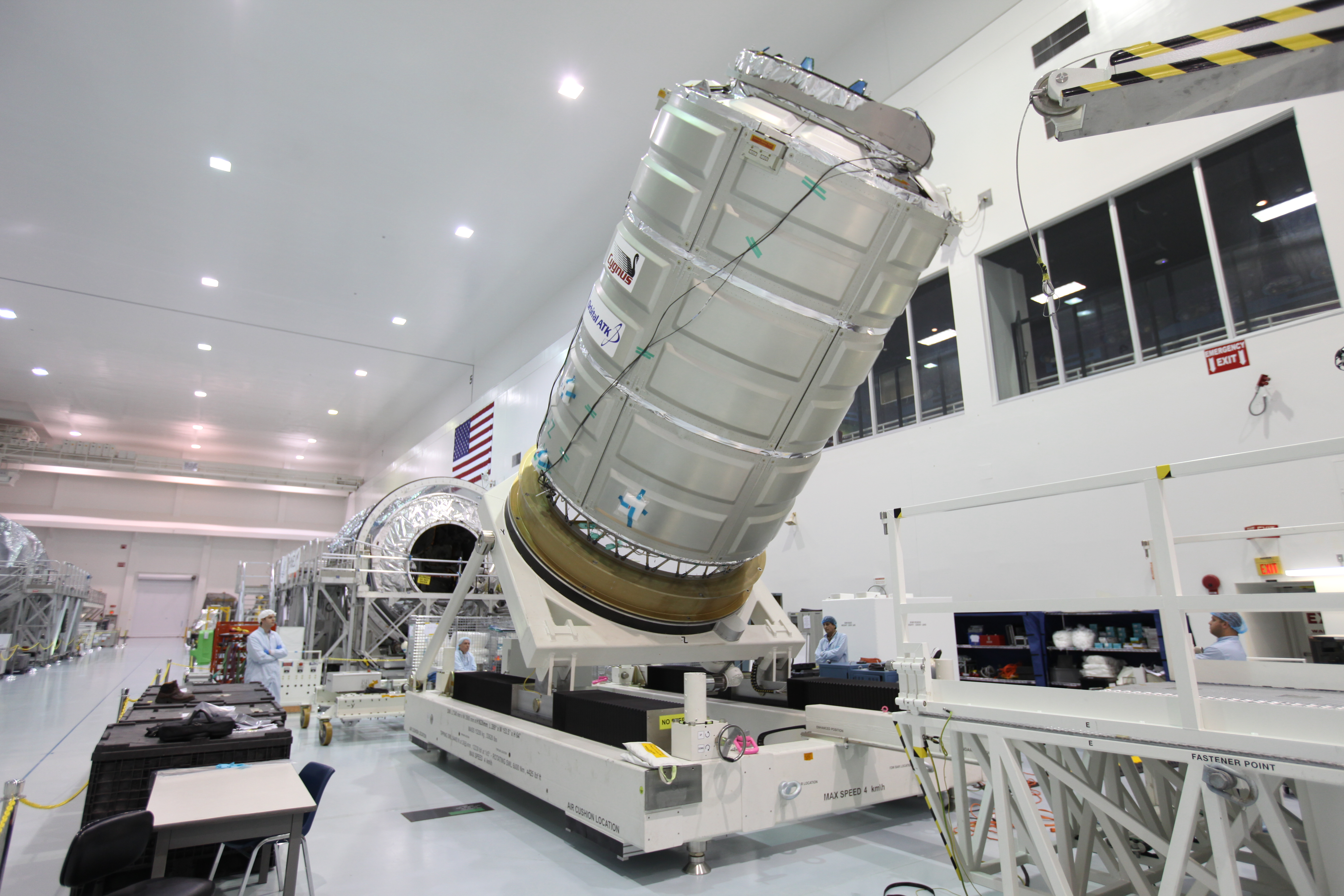
Orbital ATK Cygnus CRS-0A-7

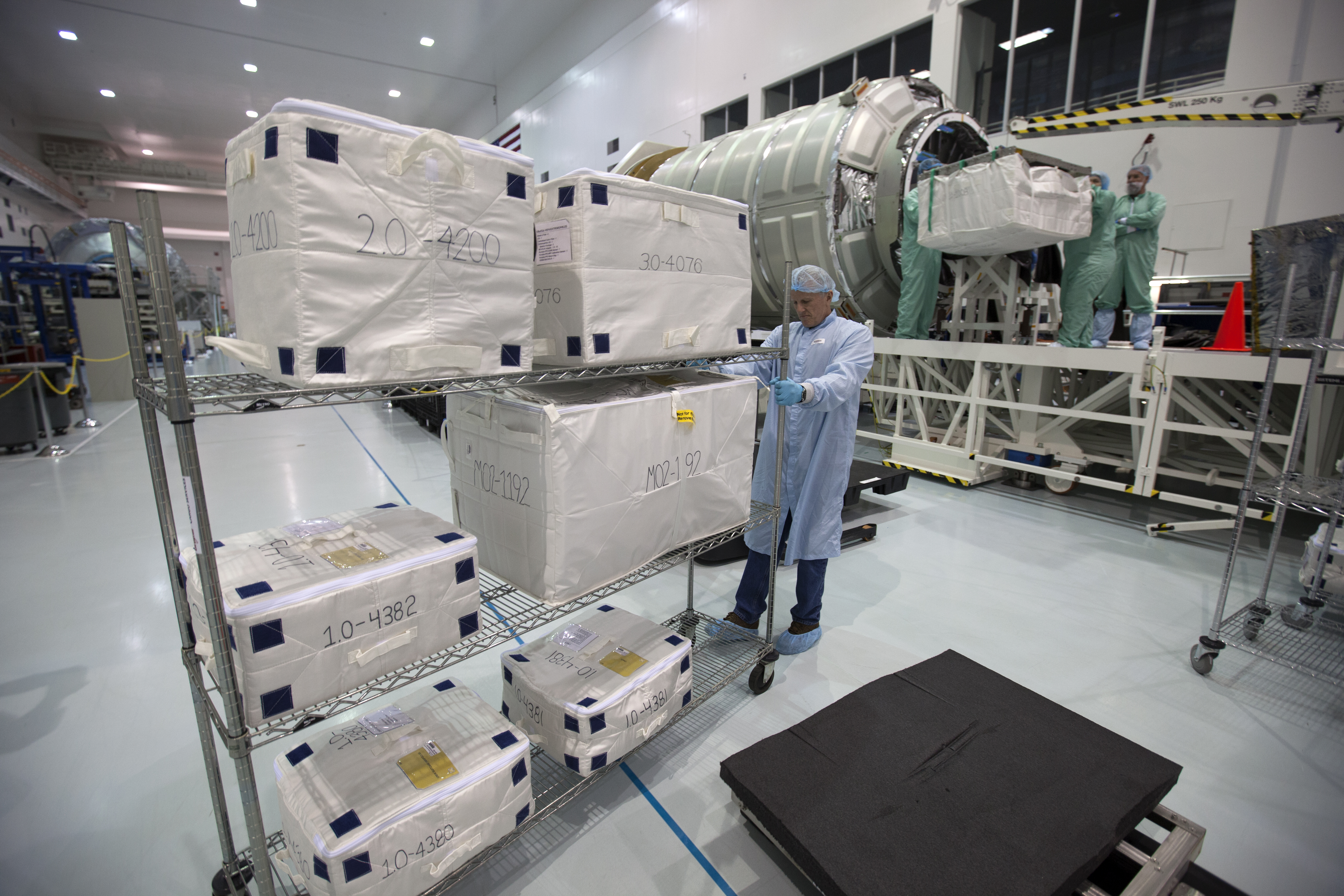
ISS Cargo bags

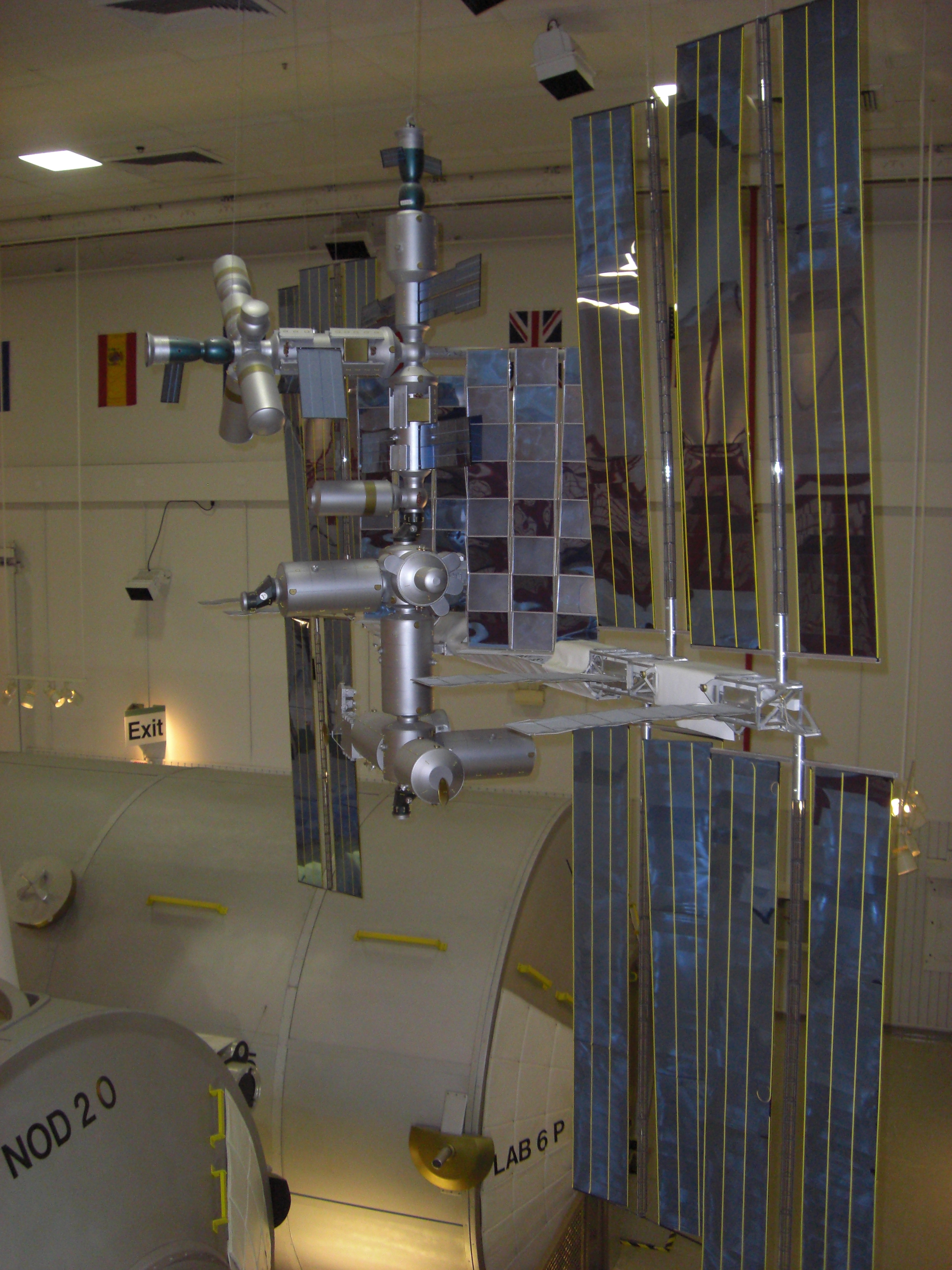
SSPF lobby

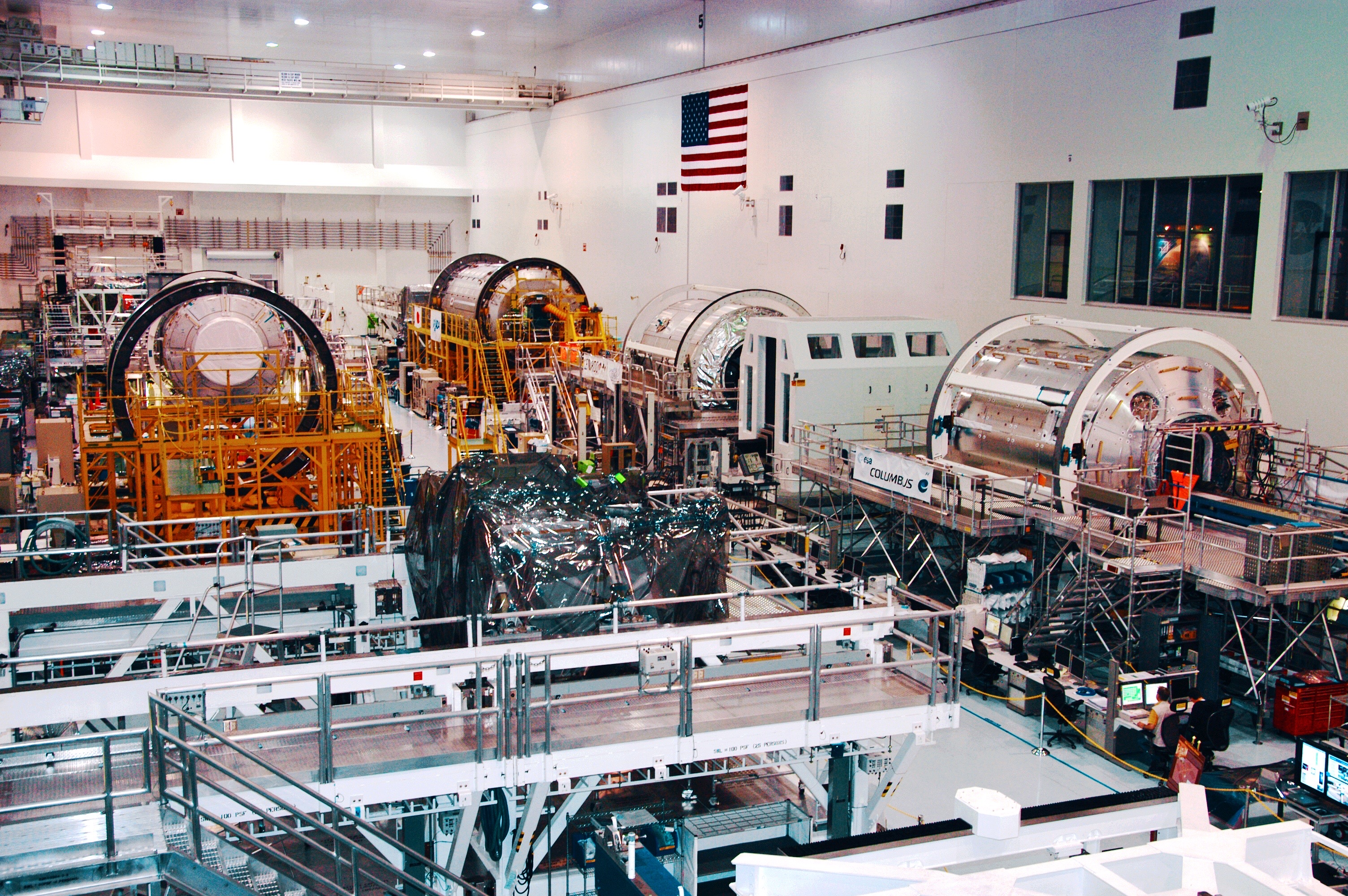
Overview of the high bay factory floor filled with space station modules

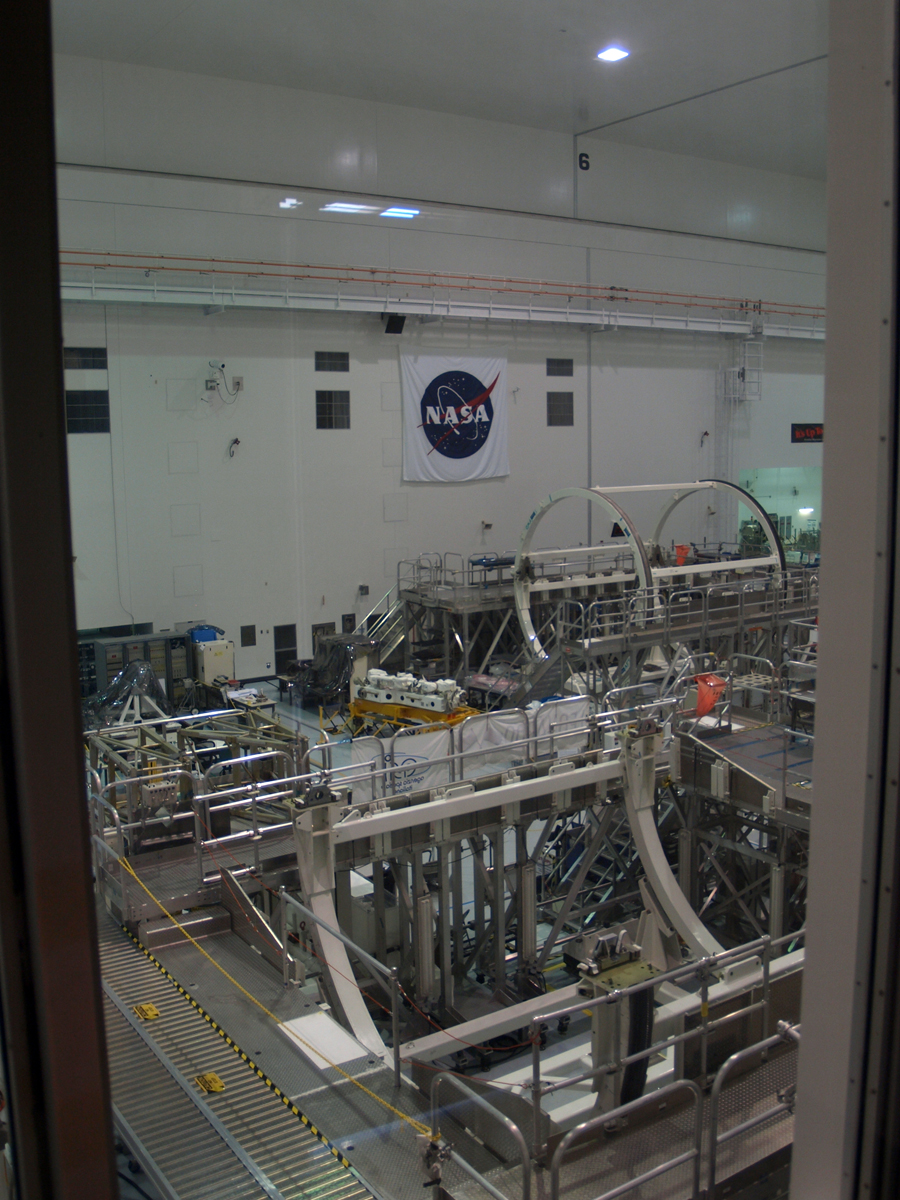
A view of an empty workstand from the high bay observation windows

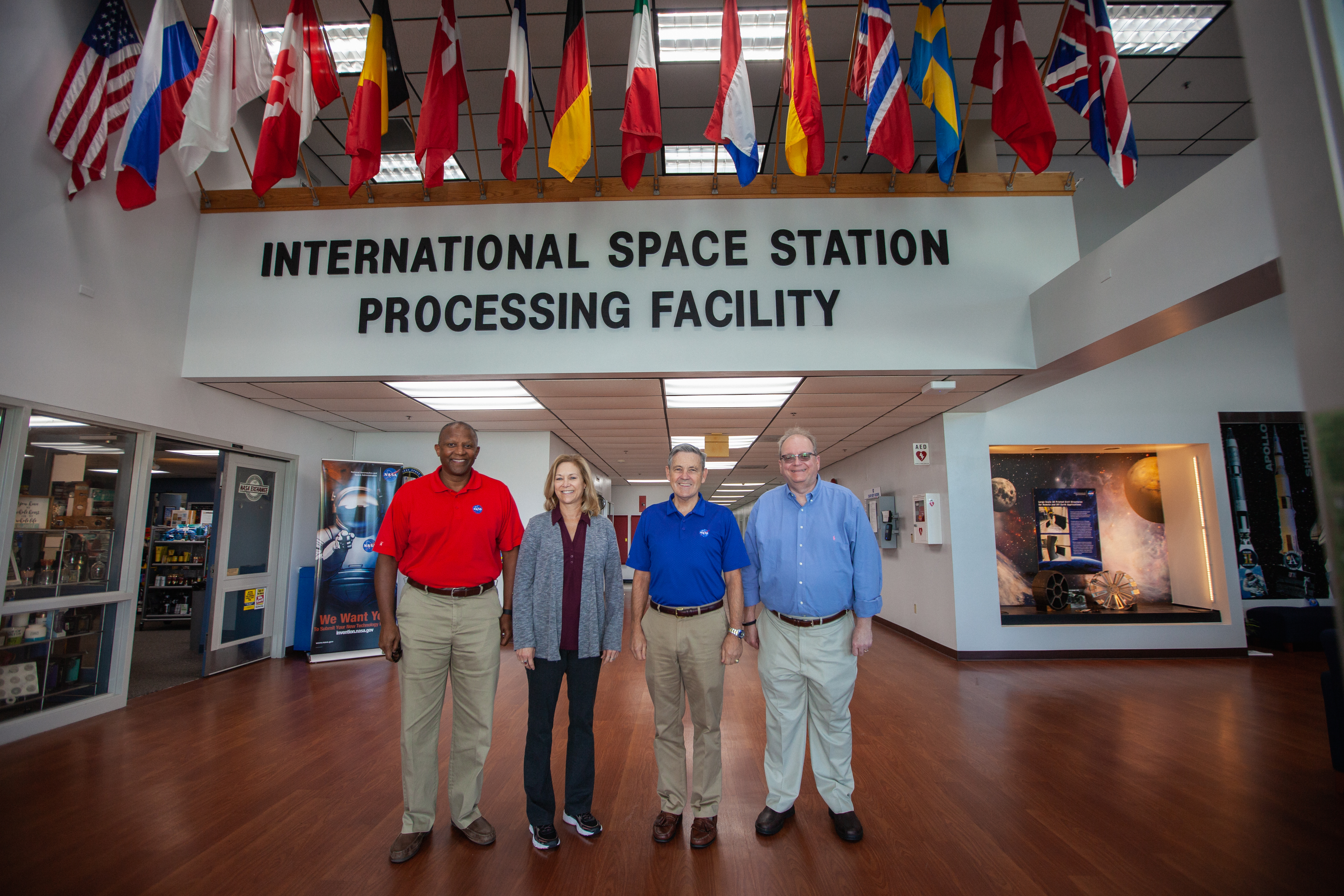
The main visitor entrance lobby to the SSPF in September 2019. Note the signage displays 'International' in addition to the building's name, but is not official.

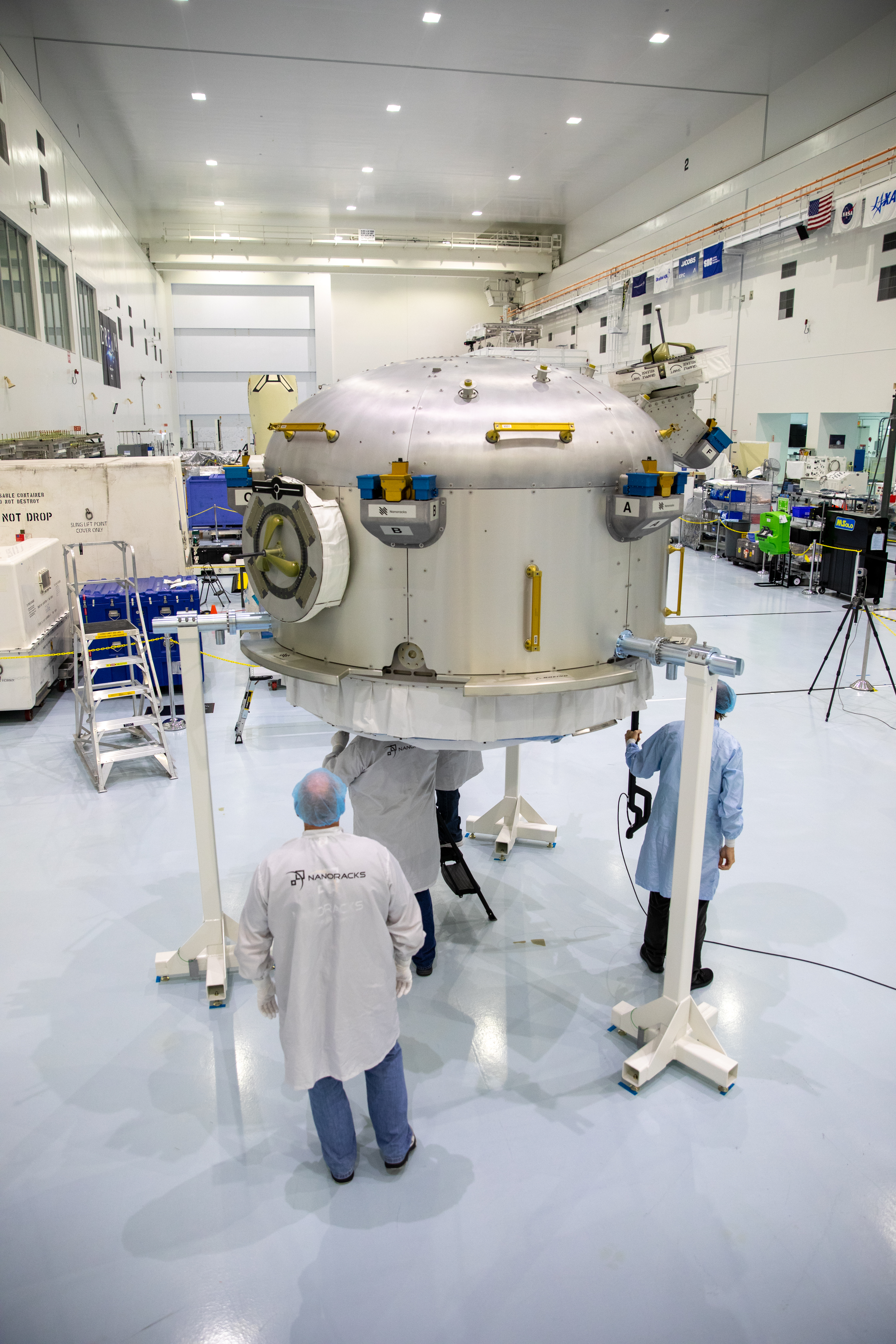
The Bishop Airlock Module being made by Nanoracks in the high bay, October 7, 2020.

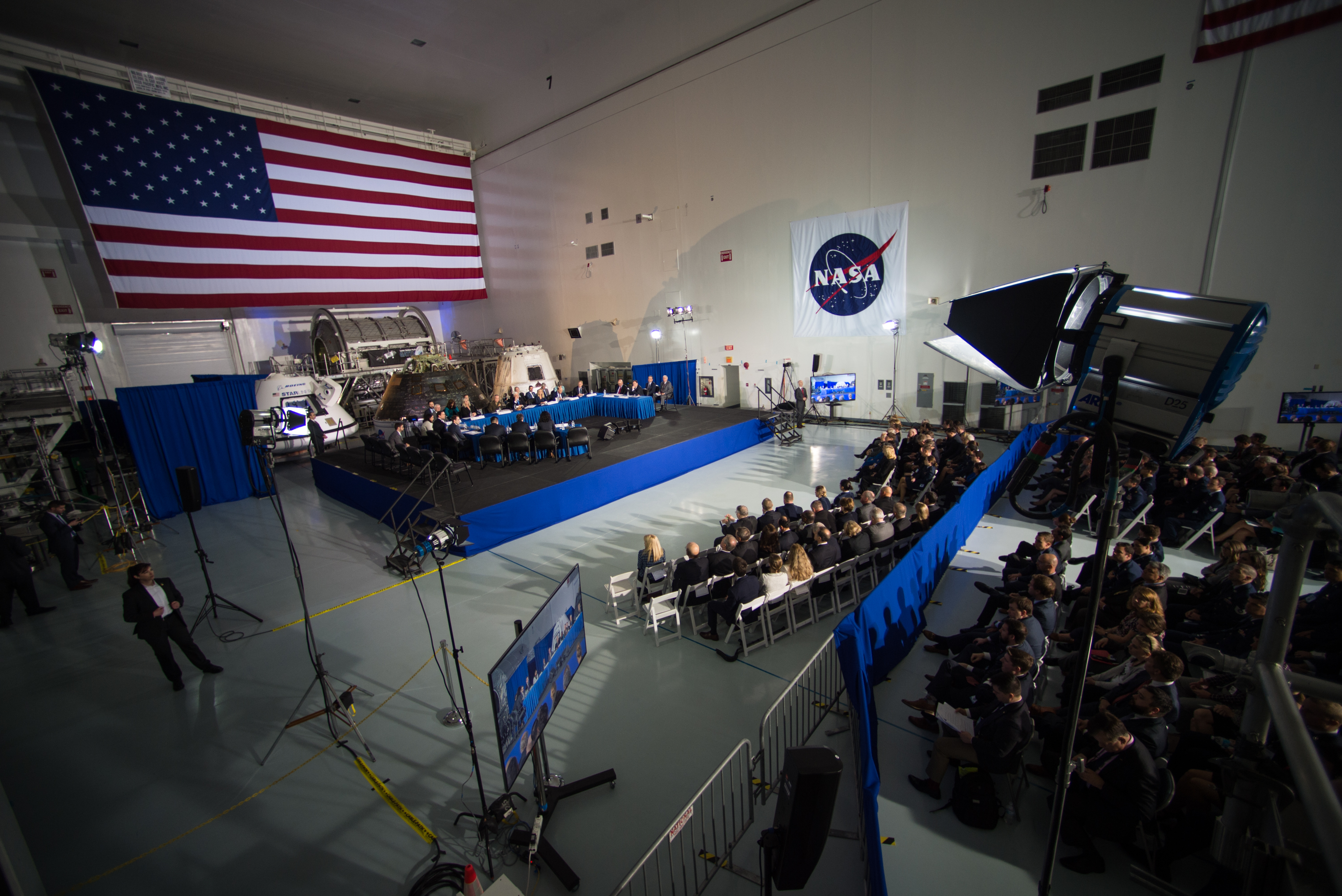
7th National Space Council meeting in the high bay, with temporary desk platforms, Feb 21, 2018

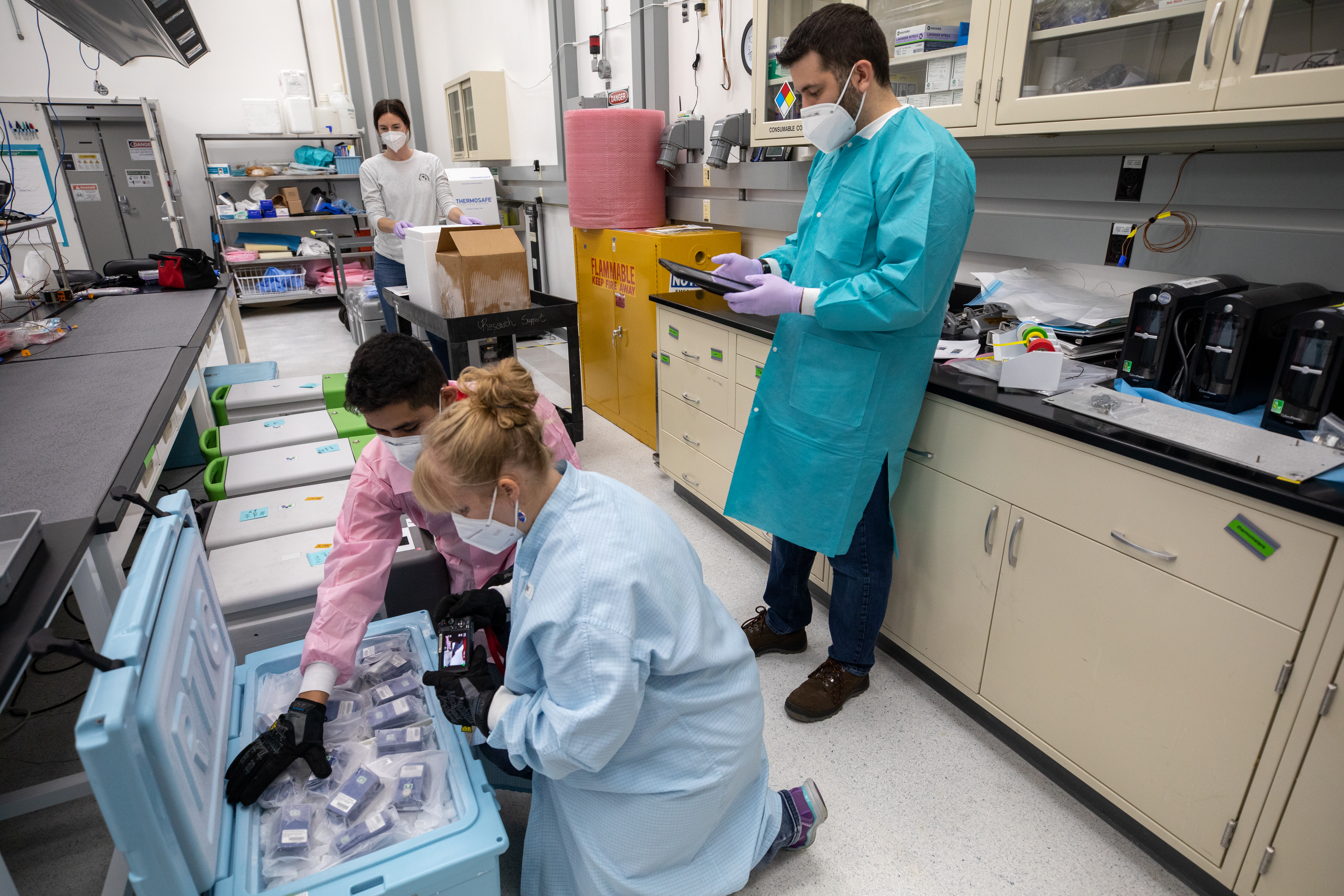
Scientists and students working on SpaceX CRS-21 returned science experiments in the SSPF lab workshop, January 2021

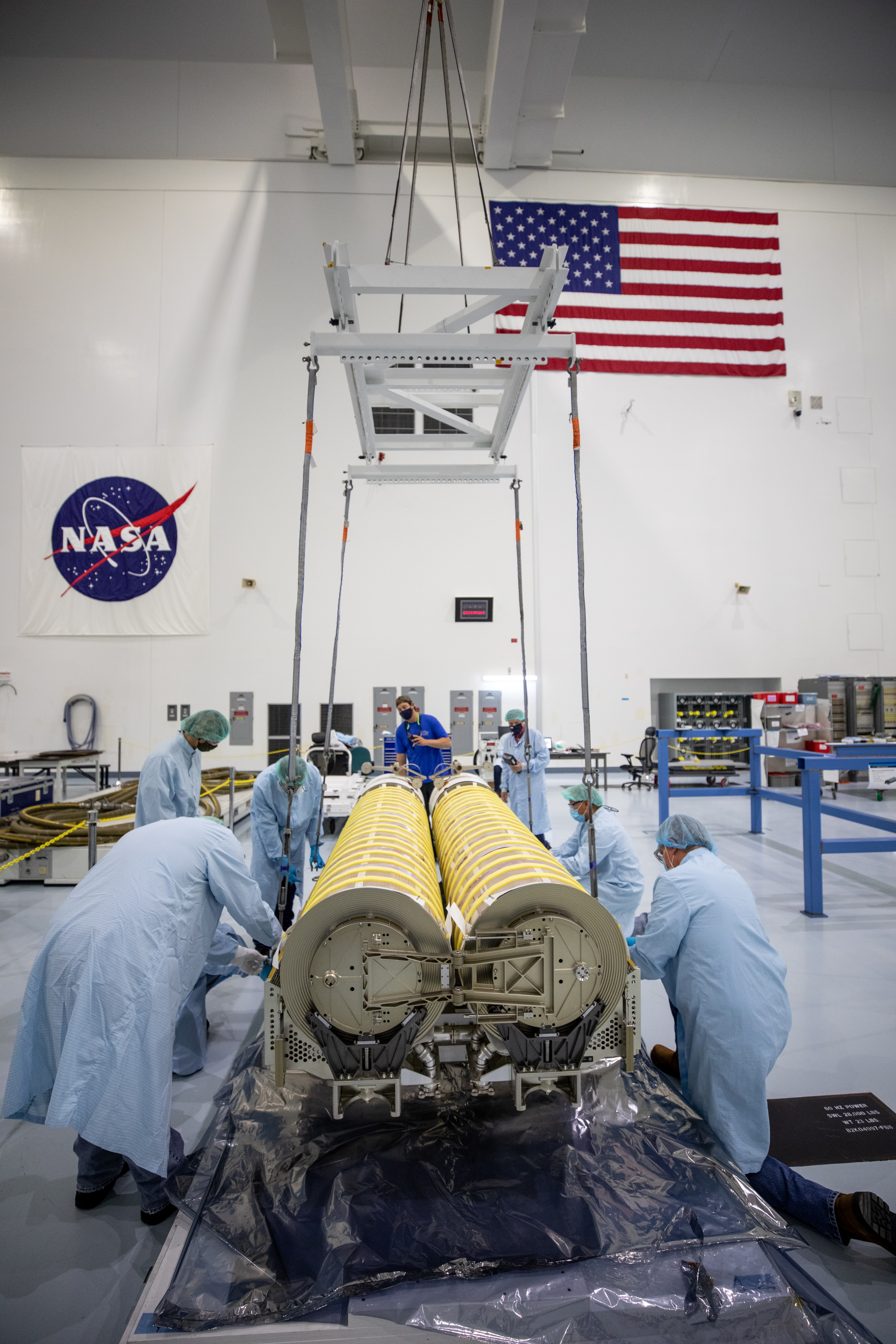
ISS roll out solar array being made in the SSPF high bay, 2 April 2021
