= Node 4 =

Proposed module/Unity static test article for the International Space Station

Node 4 (Docking Hub System) Structural Test Article
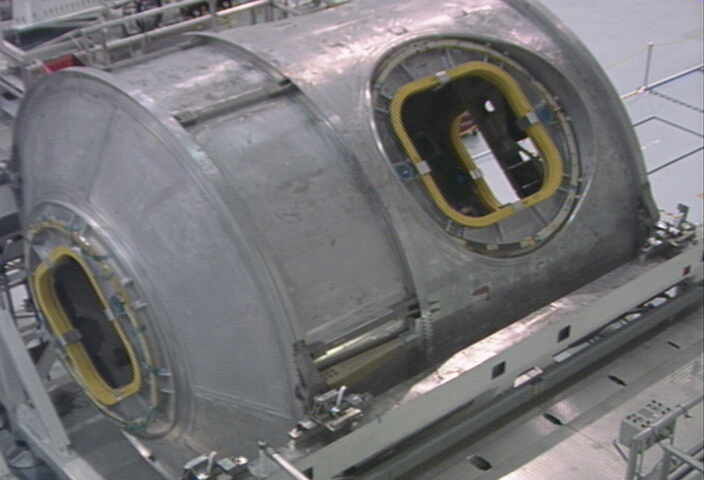
- The Node STA as seen in the Space Station Processing Facility in 2010

Module statistics
- Part of: Proposed: International Space Station, or; Exploration Gateway Platform
- Launch date: 2013 (planned)
- Launch vehicle: Atlas V or Delta IV (planned)
- Mass: ~11,600 kg (25,600 lb)
- Length: 5.47 m (17.9 ft)
- Diameter: 4.57 m (15.0 ft)

Node 4, also known as the Docking Hub System (DHS), was a proposed module of the International Space Station (ISS). In 2010, NASA was considering a 40-month design and development effort for Node 4 that would result in its launch in late 2013.

Node 4 would have been built using the Node Structural Test Article (STA) and docked to the forward port of the Harmony module. The Structural Test Article was built to facilitate testing of ISS hardware and was intended to become Node 1. However, during construction, structural design flaws were discovered. The under-construction Node 2 was renamed Node 1 (later Unity) and the STA (ex-Node 1) was put into storage at the Kennedy Space Center (KSC).

Since the Space Shuttle program was retired, had a decision to build and launch Node 4 been taken, it would have been launched by an Atlas V or Delta IV rocket.

In December 2011 Boeing proposed using Node 4 as the core of an Exploration Gateway Platform to be constructed at the ISS and relocated via space tug to an Earth-Moon Lagrange point (EML-1 or 2). The purpose of the platform would be to support lunar landing missions with a reusable lunar lander after the first two SLS flights. It would also satisfy the need for a L1 propellant depot for lunar missions. Other hardware would include an airlock, an 'international module', and a MPLM based habitat module.

In June 2020 the Node STA was moved from the Space Station Processing Facility to the Shuttle Landing Facility to make room for commercial partners.

== See also ==
- ISS Propulsion Module
