= Manufacture of the International Space Station =

Fabrication of the ISS elements

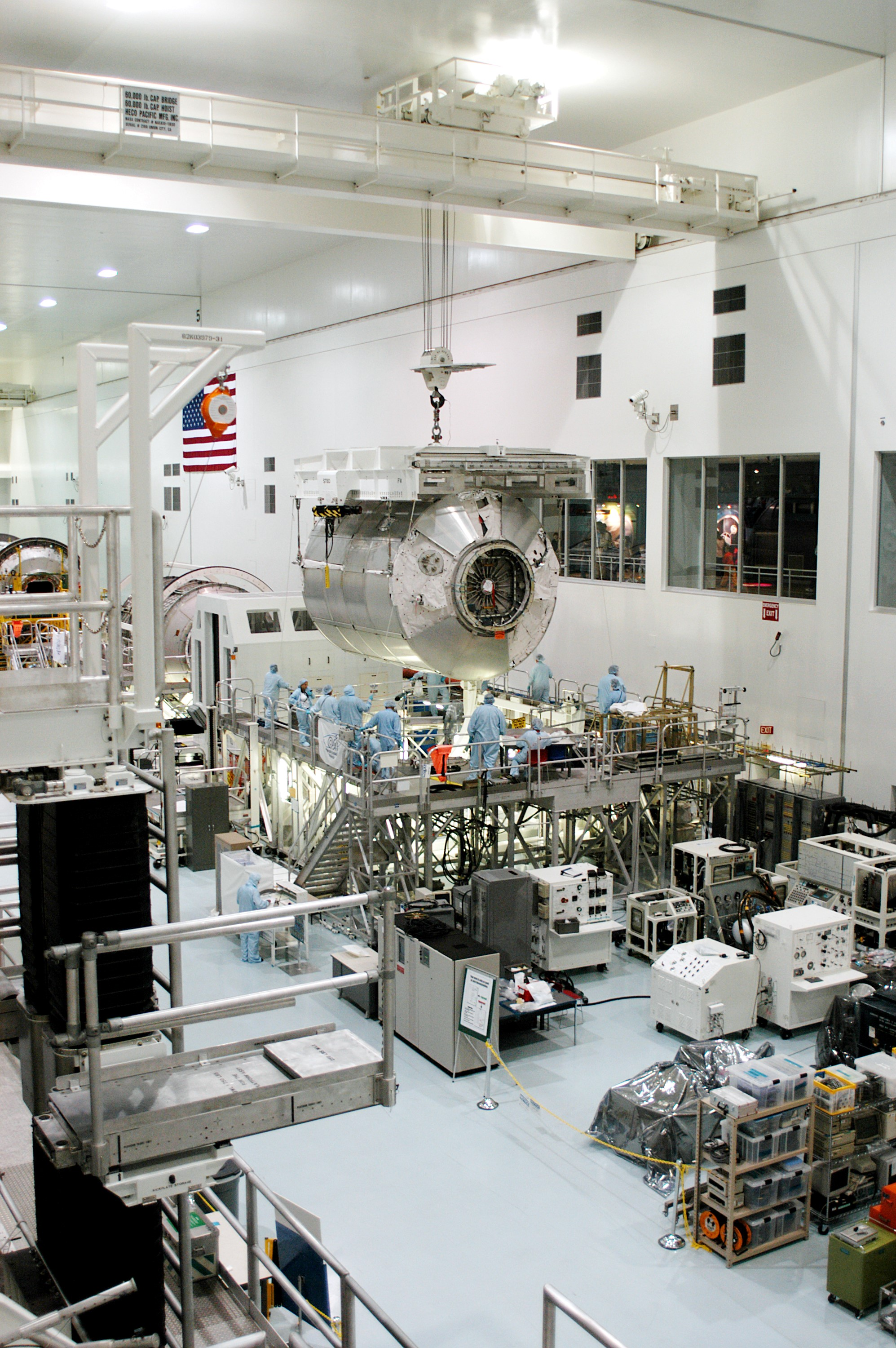
The Space Station Processing Facility at Kennedy Space Center - the prime factory for the last stages of fabrication and processing of station components for launch

The project to create the International Space Station required the utilization and/or construction of new and existing manufacturing facilities around the world, mostly in the United States and Europe. The agencies overseeing the manufacturing involved NASA, Roscosmos, the European Space Agency, JAXA, and the Canadian Space Agency. Hundreds of contractors working for the five space agencies were assigned the task of fabricating the modules, trusses, experiments and other hardware elements for the station.

The fact that the project involved the co-operation of sixteen countries working together created engineering challenges that had to be overcome: most notably the differences in language, culture and politics, but also engineering processes, management, measuring standards and communication; to ensure that all elements connect together and function according to plan. The ISS agreement program also called for the station components to be made highly durable and versatile — as it is intended to be used by astronauts indefinitely. A series of new engineering and manufacturing processes and equipment were developed, and shipments of steel, aluminium alloys and other materials were needed for the construction of the space station components.

== History and planning ==
The project began as Space Station Freedom, a US only effort, but was long delayed by funding and technical problems. Following the initial 1980's authorization (with an intended ten year construction period) by Ronald Reagan, the Station Freedom concept was designed and renamed in the 1990s to reduce costs and expand international involvement. In 1993, the United States and Russia agreed to merge their separate space station plans into a single facility integrating their respective modules and incorporating contributions from the European Space Agency and Japan. In later months, an international agreement board recruited several more space agencies and companies to collaborate to the project. The International Organization for Standardization played a crucial role in unifying and overcoming different engineering methods (such as measurements and units), languages, standards and techniques to ensure quality, engineering communication and logistical management across all manufacturing activities of the station components.

== Engineering designs ==
Engineering diagrams of various elements of the ISS, with annotations of various parts and systems on each module.

=== Technical schematics ===
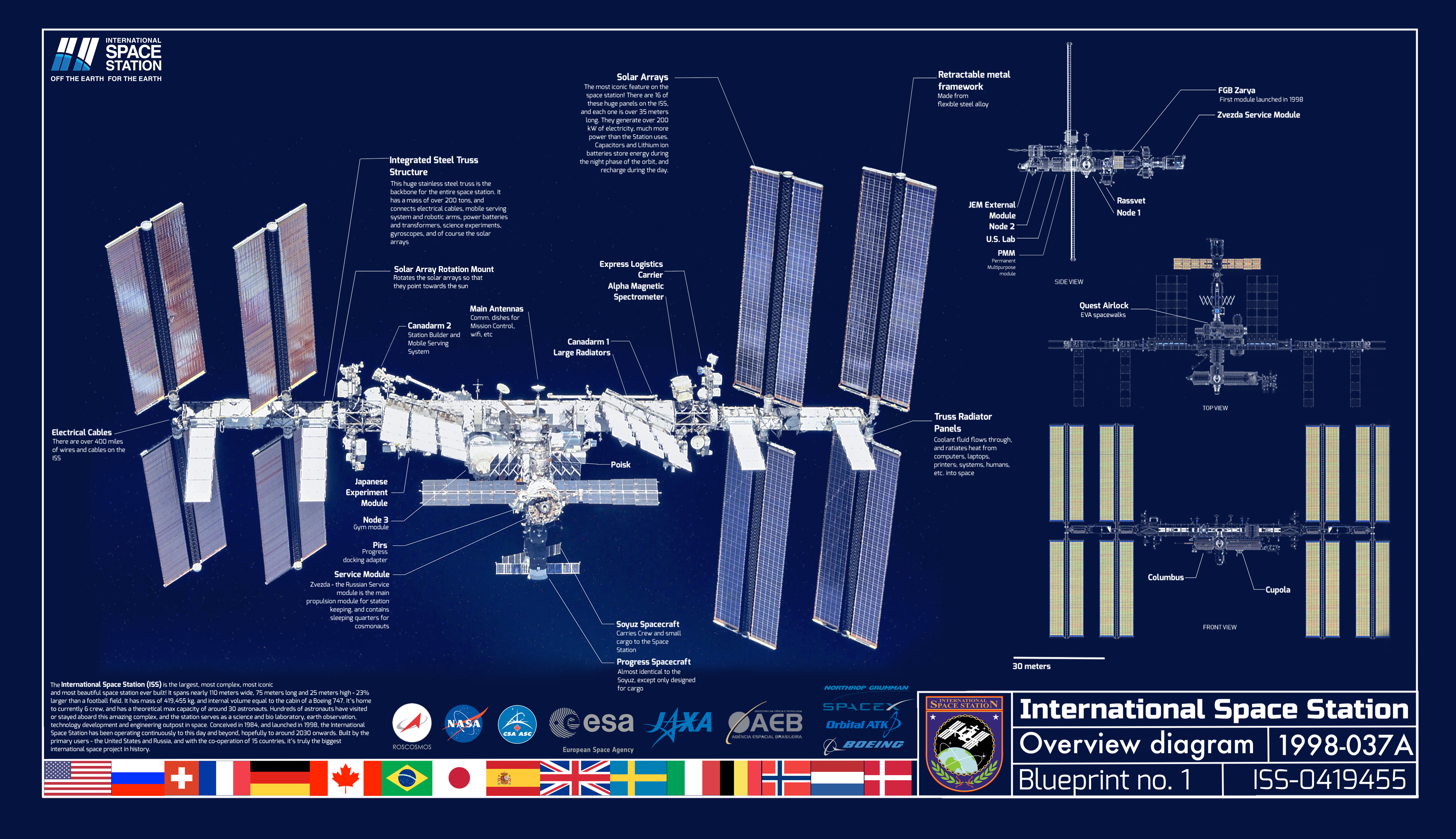
Technical blueprint of components

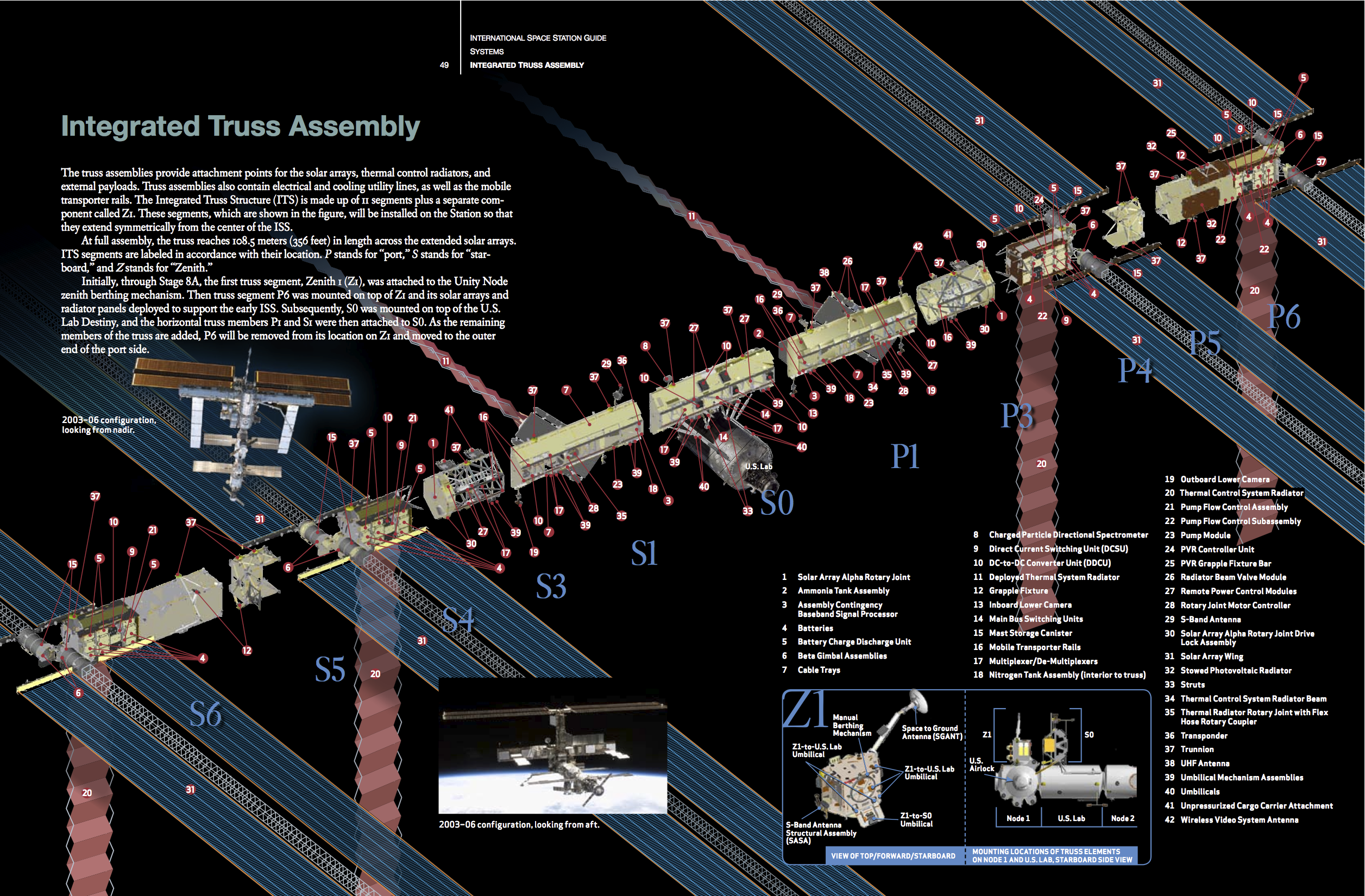
Exploded view of truss sections

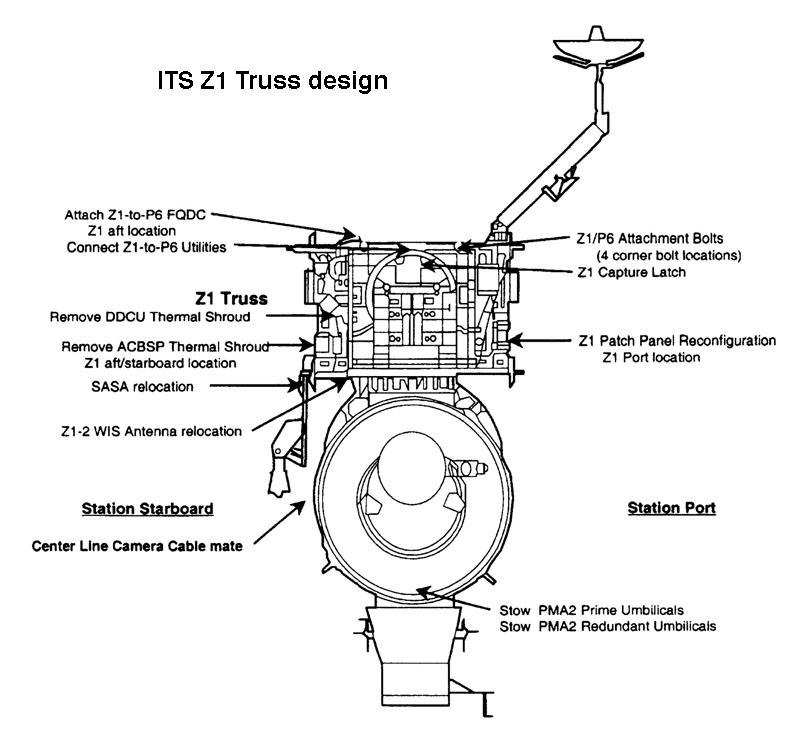
Z1 Truss design

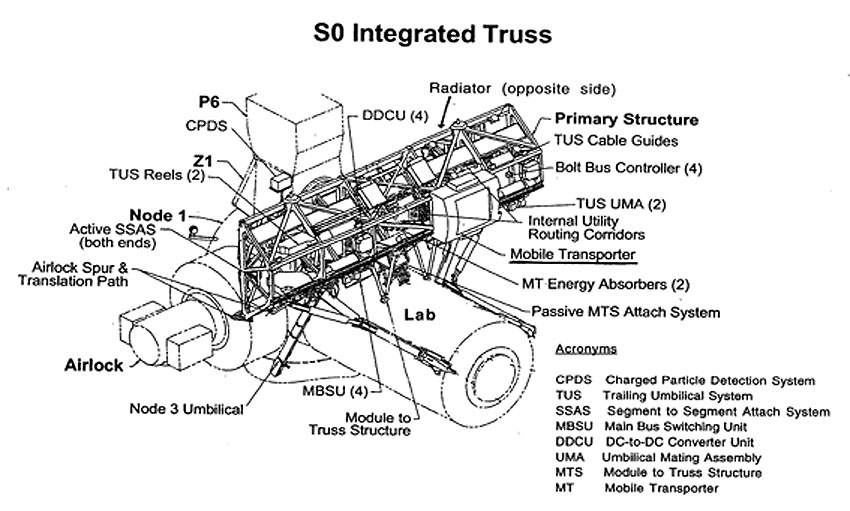
S0 Truss design

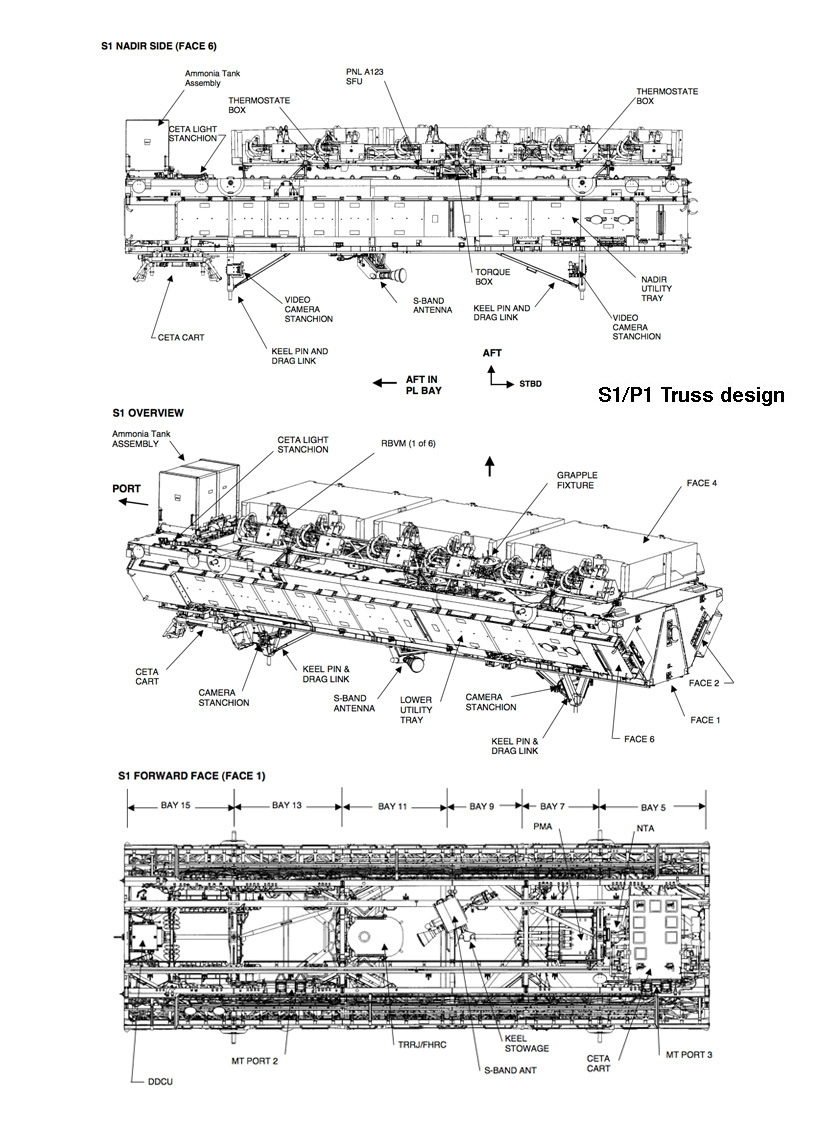
P1 / S1 Truss design

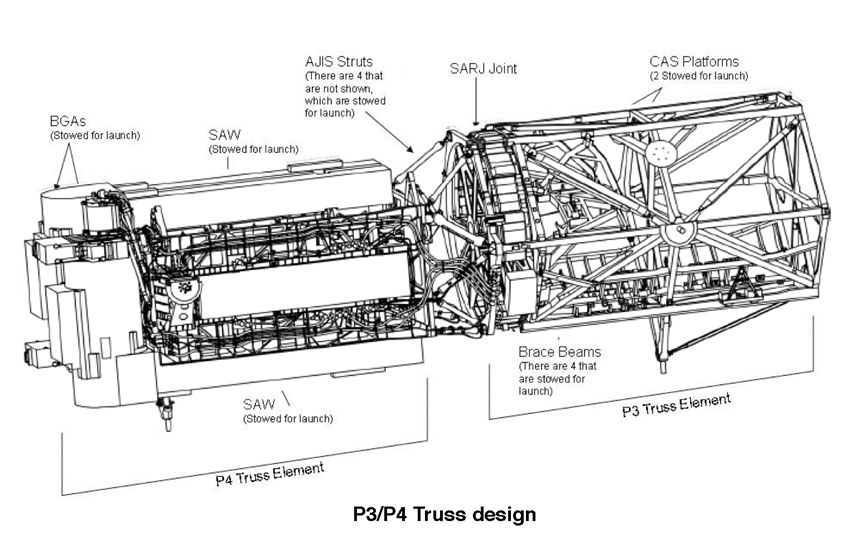
P3/4 / S3/4 Truss design

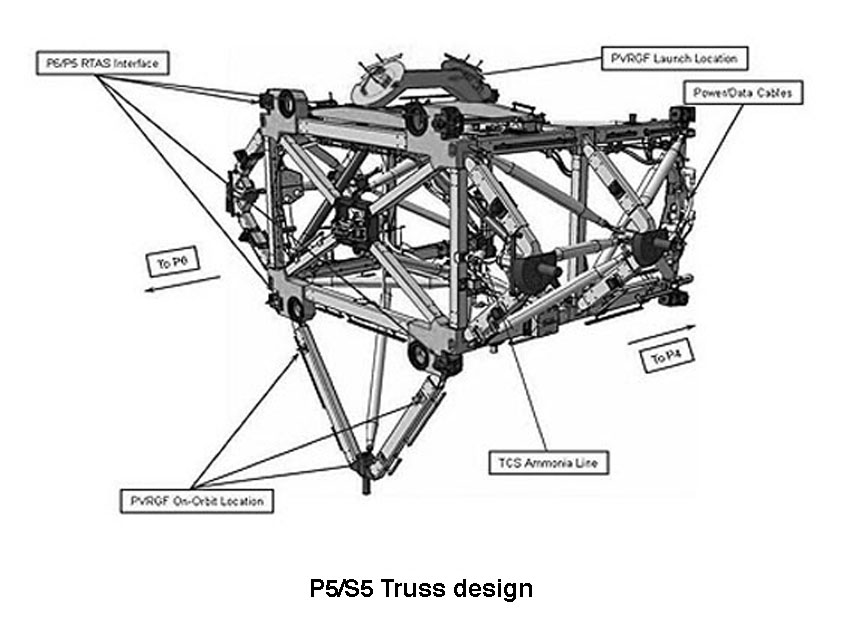
P5 / S5 Truss design

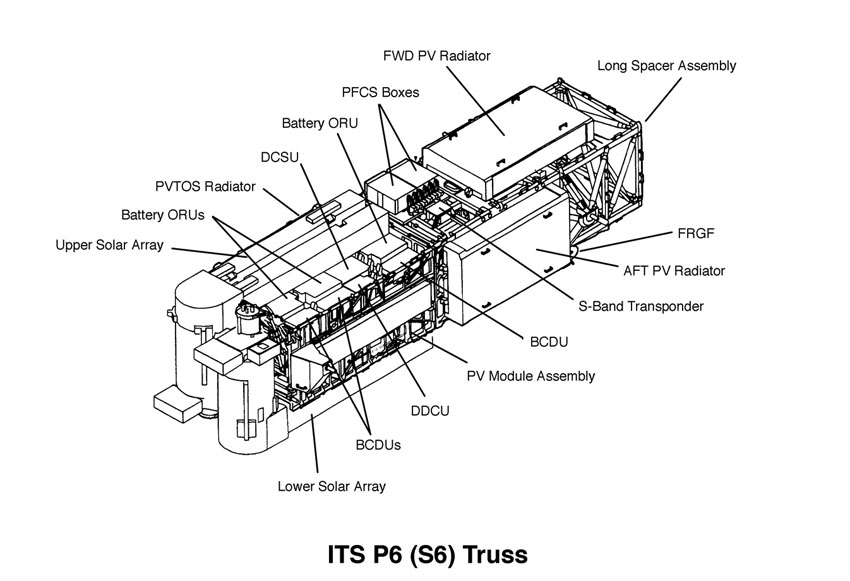
P6 / S6 Truss design

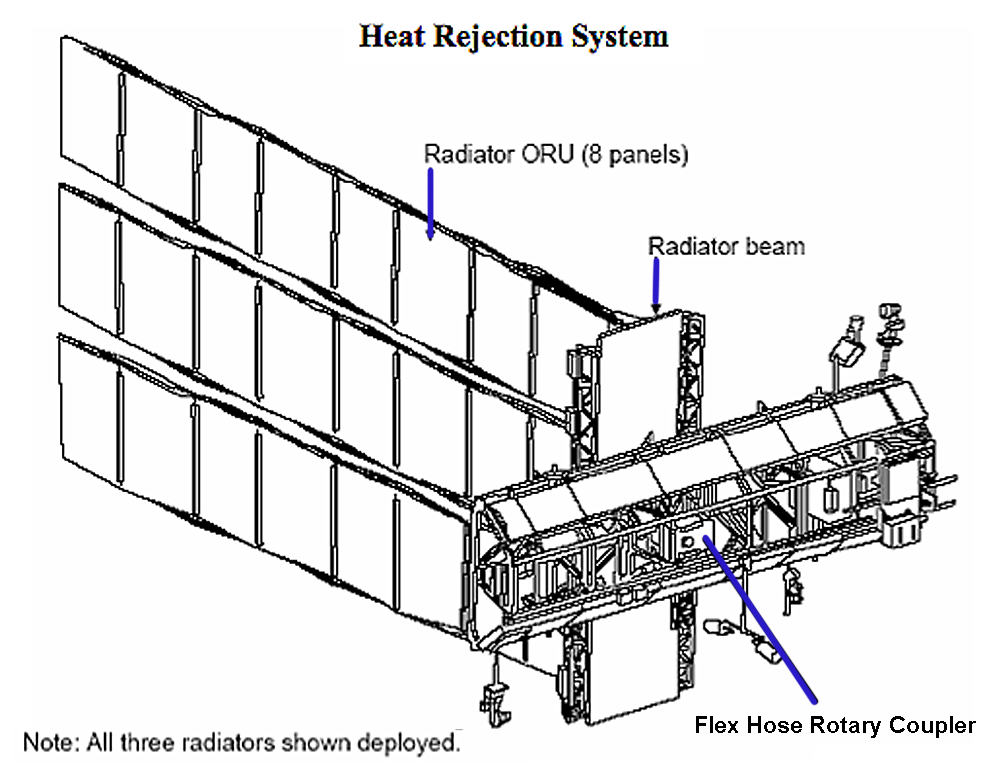
Radiator panels

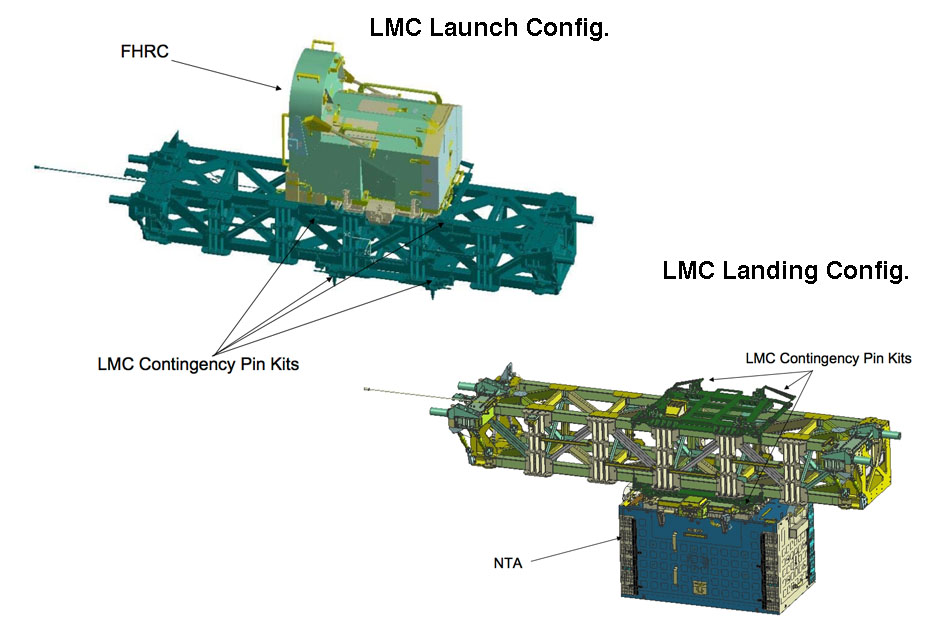
External Stowage Platform 1

Destiny lab

Quest airlock (plan view)

Quest airlock (isometric view)

Node 1

Node 2

Cupola

Columbus

Pirs

Poisk

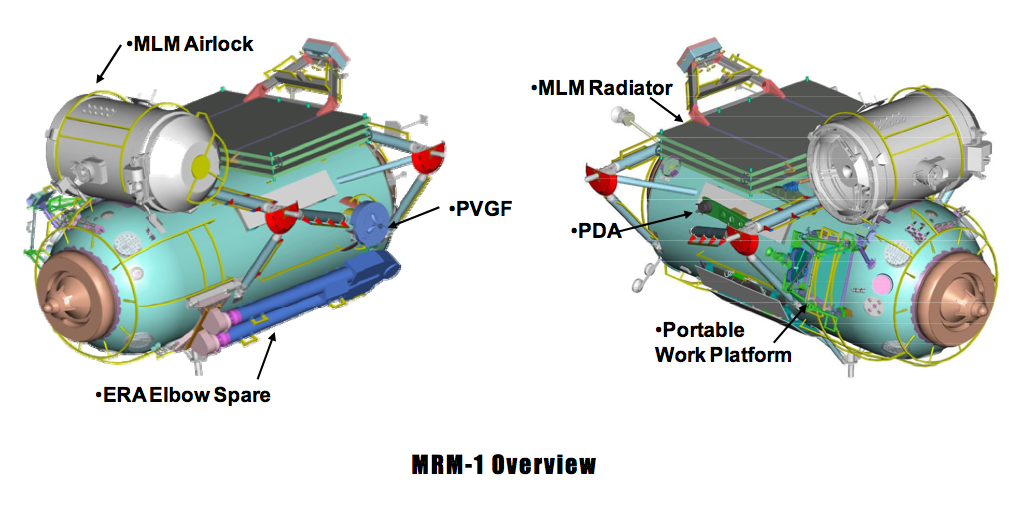
Rassvet

Japanese Experiment Module

Typical ISS rack

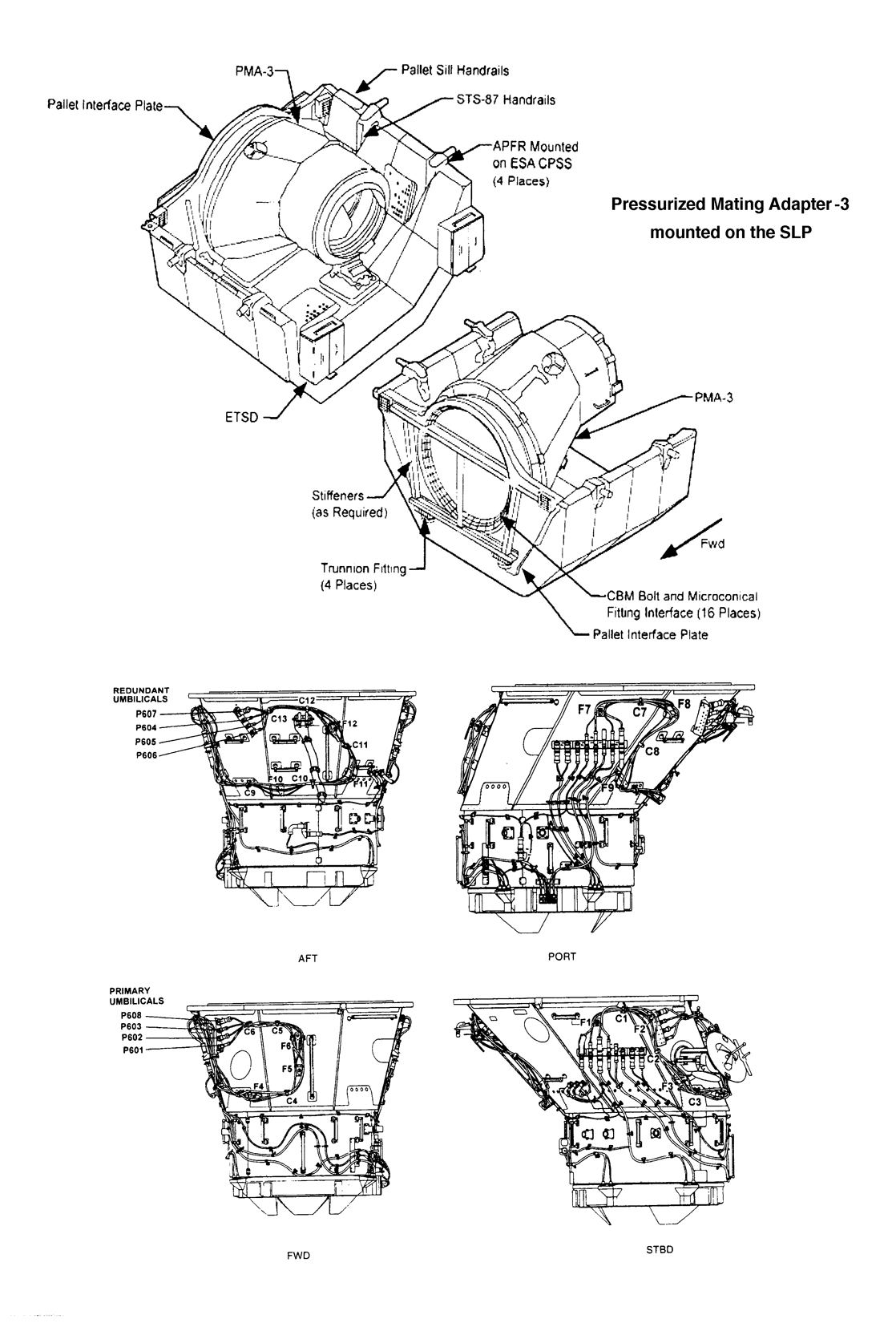
Pressurized Mating Adapters

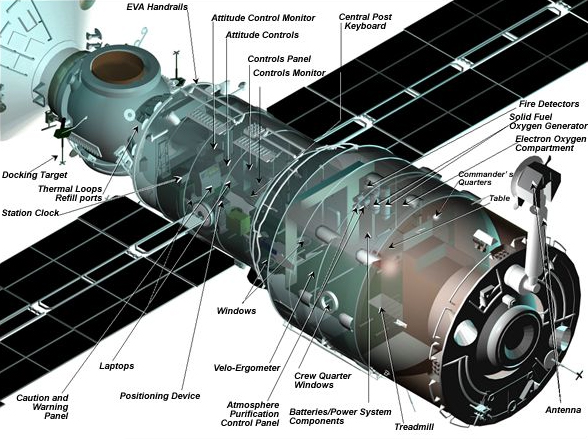
Zvezda Service Module

Zarya FGB

== Manufacturing Information and Processes ==
List of factories and manufacturing processes used in the construction and fabrication of the International Space Station modular components:

Space Station component	Overseeing agency and contractor(s)	Manufacturing facility	Materials used	Manufacturing date	Mass (kg)	Manufacturing Processes	Factory view
Zarya (FGB)	NASA, Roscosmos: Khartron corporation	Khrunichev State Research and Production Space Center	Steel; Aluminum; Kevlar; Ceramic blanket	1994	19,323	Shielded metal arc welding; Sheet metal cold rolling; Electroforming	
Unity (Node 1), PMA-1 & PMA-2	NASA: Boeing; ArcelorMittal USA; AK Steel	Marshall Space Flight Center	Steel; Kevlar	June 6, 1997	11,612	Hot rolling; Cold rolling; Computer-aided welding	
Zvezda (Service Module)	Roscosmos: RKK Energia	Khrunichev State Research and Production Space Center	Steel; Aluminum; Kevlar; Ceramic blanket	February 1985	19,051	Sheet metal cold rolling; Electroforming	
Z1 Truss & PMA-3	NASA: Boeing	Michoud Assembly Facility: Operations and Checkout Building	Steel; Sheet metal aluminum	1999	8,755 (Z1)	Hot rolling; Extrusion; Submerged arc welding	
P6 Truss & Solar Arrays	NASA: Lockheed Martin; Boeing; Alcoa	Michoud Assembly Facility: Marshall Space Flight Center	Truss: Steel; Aluminum; Solar Arrays: Crystalline silicon; Shape-memory alloy; Copper indium gallium diselenide; Nylon; Polyethylene terephthalate	1999/2000	15,824	Hot rolling; Aluminum extrusion; Investment Casting; Photovoltaic assembly	
Destiny (US Laboratory)	NASA: Boeing	Marshall Space Flight Center: Michoud Assembly Facility	Steel; Aluminum; Kevlar	December 12, 1997	14,515	Sheet roll bending; Computer-Aided welding	
External Stowage Platform-1	NASA: Airbus DS Space Systems	Goddard Space Flight Center	Steel	2000	5,760	Hot rolling; Automated welding and cutting	
Canadarm2 (SSRMS)	Canadian Space Agency: NASA	MDA Space Missions, Brampton Ontario; David Florida Laboratory	Titanium	2000/01	4,899	Seamless rolling; Milling; Robotic assembly	
Quest (Joint Airlock)	NASA: Boeing	Marshall Space Flight Center	Aluminum; Steel	2000	6,064	Cold rolling; Friction welding	
Pirs (Docking Compartment & Airlock)	RKK Energia	Korolyov, Moscow Oblast	Steel; Aluminum; Titanium	1998	3,580	Shielded metal arc welding; Sheet metal roll forming; Electroforming	
S0 Truss	NASA: Boeing; ArcelorMittal USA; AK Steel	Michoud Assembly Facility: Operations and Checkout Building; Boeing factories in Huntington Beach, California	Stainless steel; Titanium; Copper	1998/2000	13,970	Hot rolling; Investment casting; Forging; TIG Welding	
Mobile Base System	NASA: Northrop Grumman; MD Robotics	Northrop Grumman factory in Carpinteria, CA	Stainless Steel; Titanium	2001	1,450	TIG Welding; Hot rolling	
S1 Truss and Radiators	NASA: Lockheed Martin; Boeing	Michoud Assembly Facility	Stainless steel; Sheet metal titanium	June 2002	14,120	Hot rolling; Investment casting; Forging; TIG Welding; Friction welding	
P1 Truss and Radiators	NASA: Lockheed Martin; Boeing	Michoud Assembly Facility	Stainless steel; Sheet metal titanium	July 2002	13.748	same as S1 Truss	
ESP-2	NASA: Airbus DS Space Systems	Goddard Space Flight Center	Steel; Titanium	October 2005	2,676	Punch cutting; Hot rolling; Automated welding	
P3/P4 Truss & Solar Arrays	NASA: Lockheed Martin; Boeing	Michoud Assembly Facility: Operations and Checkout Building	Truss: Stainless steel; Titanium; Solar Arrays: Crystalline silicon; Shape-memory alloy; Copper indium gallium diselenide; Nylon; Polyethylene terephthalate	2005/06	15,900	Hot rolling; Aluminum extrusion; Investment Casting; Photovoltaic assembly	
P5 Truss	NASA: Boeing	Operations and Checkout Building	Anodized steel	February 2007	1,818	Roll forming; Anodizing	
S3/S4 Truss & Solar Arrays	NASA: Lockheed Martin; Boeing	Michoud Assembly Facility: Operations and Checkout Building	Same as P3/P4 trusses	May 12, 2005	15,900	Same as P3/P4 trusses	
S5 Truss and ESP-3	NASA: Airbus; Boeing	Operations and Checkout Building: Goddard Space Flight Center	Steel (some anodized)	2007	13.795	Same as P5 and ESP-1 and 2	
Harmony (Node 2); Relocation of P6 Truss	European Space Agency, Italian Space Agency: Thales Alenia Space	Thales Alenia Space factory in Turin, Italy	Stainless steel (outer cladding); 6061 Aluminum alloy (for hull)	May 2003	14,288	Roll bending; Metal inert gas welding	
Columbus (European Laboratory)	European Space Agency: EADS Astrium Space Transportation	European Space Research and Technology Centre: EADS factory in Bremen, Germany	Stainless steel; Kevlar; aluminium	April 2006	12,800	Roll bending; Hot and cold rolling; Metal inert gas welding	
Dextre	Canadian Space Agency: MacDonald Dettwiler	MacDonald Dettwiler (now MDA Space Missions) factory in Brampton Ontario	Titanium; Stainless steel; Kevlar fabric	2004	1,734	CNC milling; Tube beading; Robotic assembly	
Japanese Logistics Module (ELM-PS)	JAXA	Tsukuba Space Center	Stainless steel; Titanium; Aluminum; Kevlar	April 2, 2007	8,386	Deep drawing; Roll bending; Metal inert gas welding; Friction welding	
Japanese Pressurized Module (JEM-PM); JEM Robotic Arm (JEM-RMS)	JAXA (formerly NASDA): Institute of Space and Astronautical Science	Tsukuba Space Center	Stainless steel; Titanium; Aluminum; Kevlar	November 2005	15,900 (JEM-PM)	Deep drawing; Roll bending; Metal inert gas welding	
S6 Truss & Solar Arrays	NASA: Lockheed Martin	Michoud Assembly Facility	same as P4/S4 truss and solar arrays	2006/07	15,900	same as P4/S4 truss and solar arrays	
Japanese Exposed Facility (JEM-EF)	JAXA: Institute of Space and Astronautical Science	Tsukuba Space Center	Stainless Steel; Titanium; Aluminum; Ceramic fabric; Kevlar	May 28, 2003	4,100	Laser cutting; Press brake bending; TIG welding; Brazing	
Poisk (MRM-2)	Roscosmos: RKK Energia	Khrunichev State Research and Production Space Center	Aluminum alloy; Steel; Ceramic fabric; Kevlar	2008/09	3,670	same as Pirs	
ExPRESS Logistics Carriers 1 & 2	NASA: Brazilian Space Agency; Goddard Space Flight Center; Johnson Space Center	All three contracting facilities	Stainless steel; Carbon steel; Kevlar; Aluminum alloy	2008/09	6,277	Punch cutting; Roll forming; Robotic welding	
Tranquility (Node 3)	NASA, European Space Agency: Italian Space Agency; Thales Alenia Space; Tata Steel Europe	Cannes Mandelieu Space Center	Stainless steel	April 2005	12,247	Roll bending; Metal inert gas welding; Stamp forming	
Cupola	NASA, European Space Agency: Alenia Spazio; Tata Steel Europe; Thales Alenia Space	Cannes Mandelieu Space Center; Turin factory in Italy	Forged Aluminum; Stainless steel; Anodized steel; silica and borosilicate bulletproof glass	2003/07	1,800	Forging; Laser cutting; CNC milling; Glass fusing	
Rassvet (MRM-1)	Roscosmos, NASA: RKK Energia; Astrotech Corporation	Khrunichev State Research and Production Space Center: Space Station Processing Facility; Astrotech factory at KSC	Aluminum alloy; Sheet metal stainless steel; Ceramic and Kevlar fabric	July 2009	5,075	Brazing; Roll bending; Forging; CNC milling	
Leonardo (PMM)	Italian Space Agency, NASA	Thales Alenia Space Turin factory in Italy; Cannes Mandelieu Space Center	Stainless steel	2000/01	9,896	Roll bending; Brazing; TIG welding	
EXPRESS Logistics Carrier 3	NASA	Goddard Space Flight Center: Michoud Assembly Facility	Steel; Titanium	2010/11	6,637	Same as ELC 1 & 2	
EXPRESS Logistics Carrier 4	NASA	Goddard Space Flight Center	Steel; Titanium	2010/11	6,731	Same as ELC 1 & 2	
Alpha Magnetic Spectrometer	CERN: United States Department of Energy	CERN, Geneva Switzerland	Stainless steel; Spectrometer materials and instruments	August 2010	6,731	Spectrometer development and assembly: Investment casting	
Bigelow Expandable Activity Module	NASA: Bigelow Aerospace; Sierra Nevada Corporation	Bigelow Aerospace factory in Las Vegas, Nevada	Vinyl polymer foam; Kevlar; Metalized mylar	March 12, 2015	3.2	Composite lamination	
Nanoracks Bishop Airlock	NanoRacks: Boeing	Thales Alenia Space factory Space Station Processing Facility	Stainless steel; Aluminium alloy; Composite materials	2017-20	325 kg	Milling; Roll bending; MIG welding	
Nauka (MLM); European Robotic Arm	Roscosmos	Khrunichev State Research and Production Space Center	Same as Zarya	2005/18	20,300	Same as Zarya, with additions	
Prichal	Roscosmos: RKK Energia	Khrunichev State Research and Production Space Center	Same as Poisk	2017/20	3,890	Same as Poisk	
Roll Out Solar Arrays	NASA: Boeing; Redwire; Deployable Space Systems	Deployable Space Systems, Inc. (DSSI): Space Station Processing Facility	Crystalline silicon; Shape-memory alloy; Copper indium gallium diselenide; Nylon; Polyethylene terephthalate	2014-present	1,002	Hot rolling; Aluminum extrusion; Investment Casting; Photovoltaic assembly	

Decommissioned Components are shown in gray.

== Transportation ==
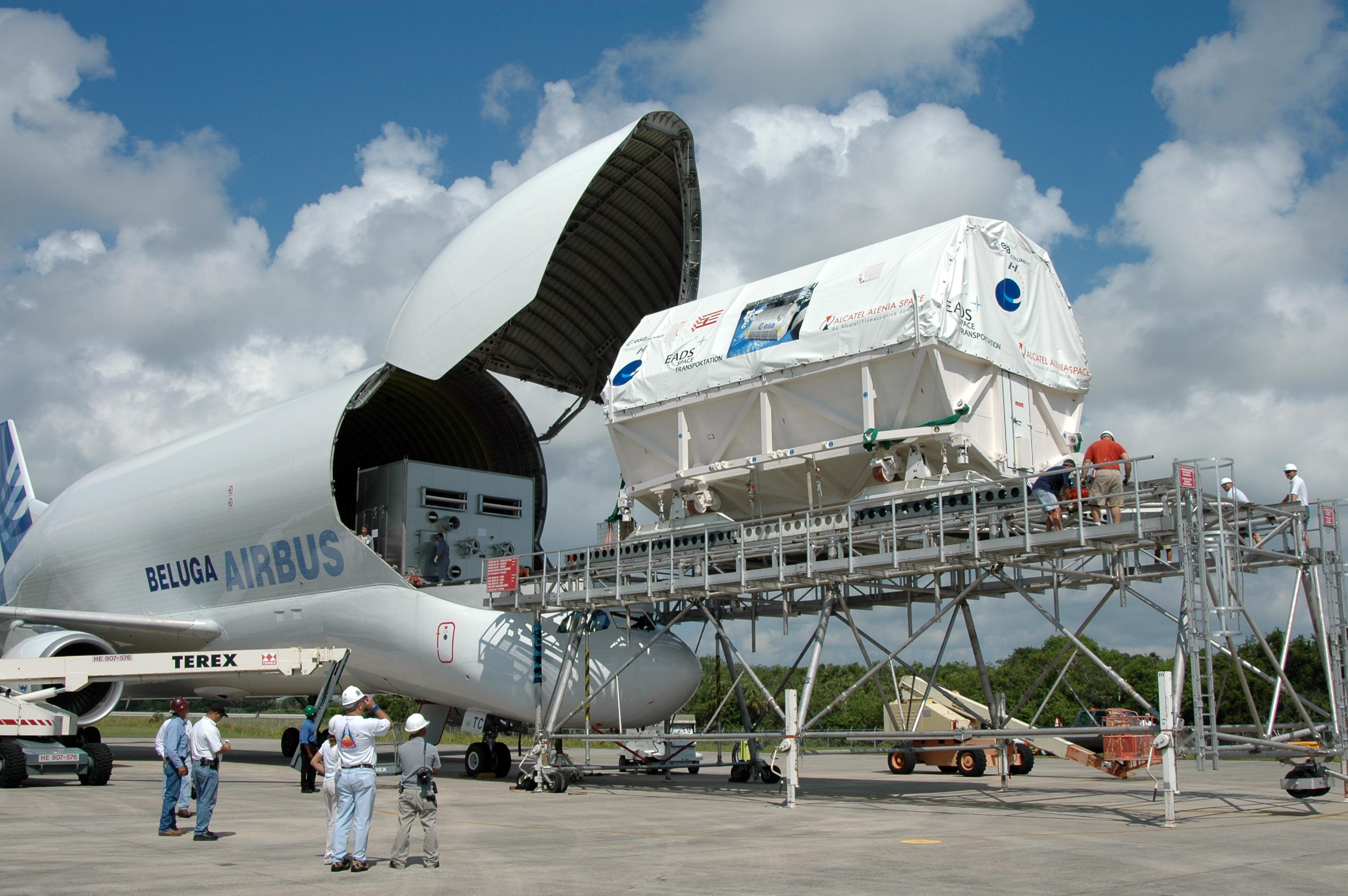
The European Columbus module being unloaded from the Airbus Beluga at the Shuttle Landing Facility

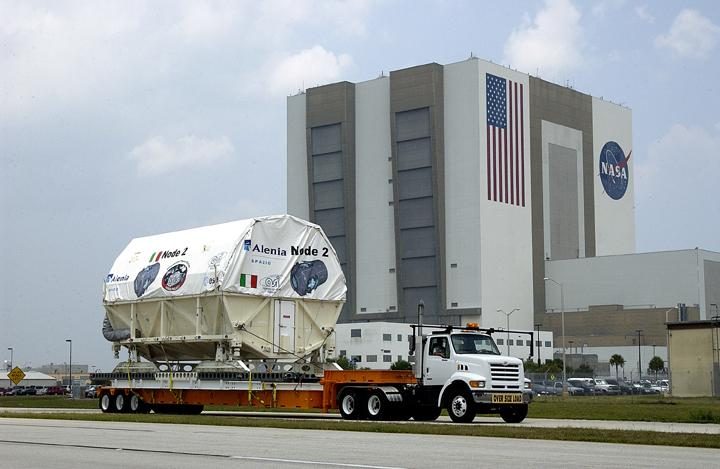
Node 2 inside its transportation container on its way by road to the SSPF, past the Vehicle Assembly Building from the SLF runway

Once manufactured or fabricated sufficiently, most of the space station elements were transported by aircraft (usually the Airbus Beluga or the Antonov An-124) to the Kennedy Space Center Space Station Processing Facility for final manufacturing stages, checks and launch processing. Some elements arrived by ship at Port Canaveral.

Each module for aircraft transport was safely housed in a custom-designed shipping container with foam insulation and an outer shell of sheet metal, to protect it from damage and the elements. At their respective European, Russian and Japanese factories, the modules were transported to their nearest airport by road in their containers, loaded into the cargo aircraft and were flown to Kennedy Space Center's Shuttle Landing Facility for unloading and final transfers to the SSPF and or the Operations and Checkout Building in the KSC industrial area. The American and Canadian-built components such as the US lab, Node 1, Quest airlock, truss and solar array segments, and the Canadarm-2 were either flown by the Aero Spacelines Super Guppy to KSC, or transported by road and rail.

After final stages of manufacturing, systems testing and launch checkout, all ISS components are loaded into a payload transfer container in the shape of the Space Shuttle payload bay. This container safely carries the component in its launch configuration until it is hoisted vertically at the launch pad gantry for transfer to the Space Shuttle orbiter for launch and in-orbit assembly of the International Space Station.

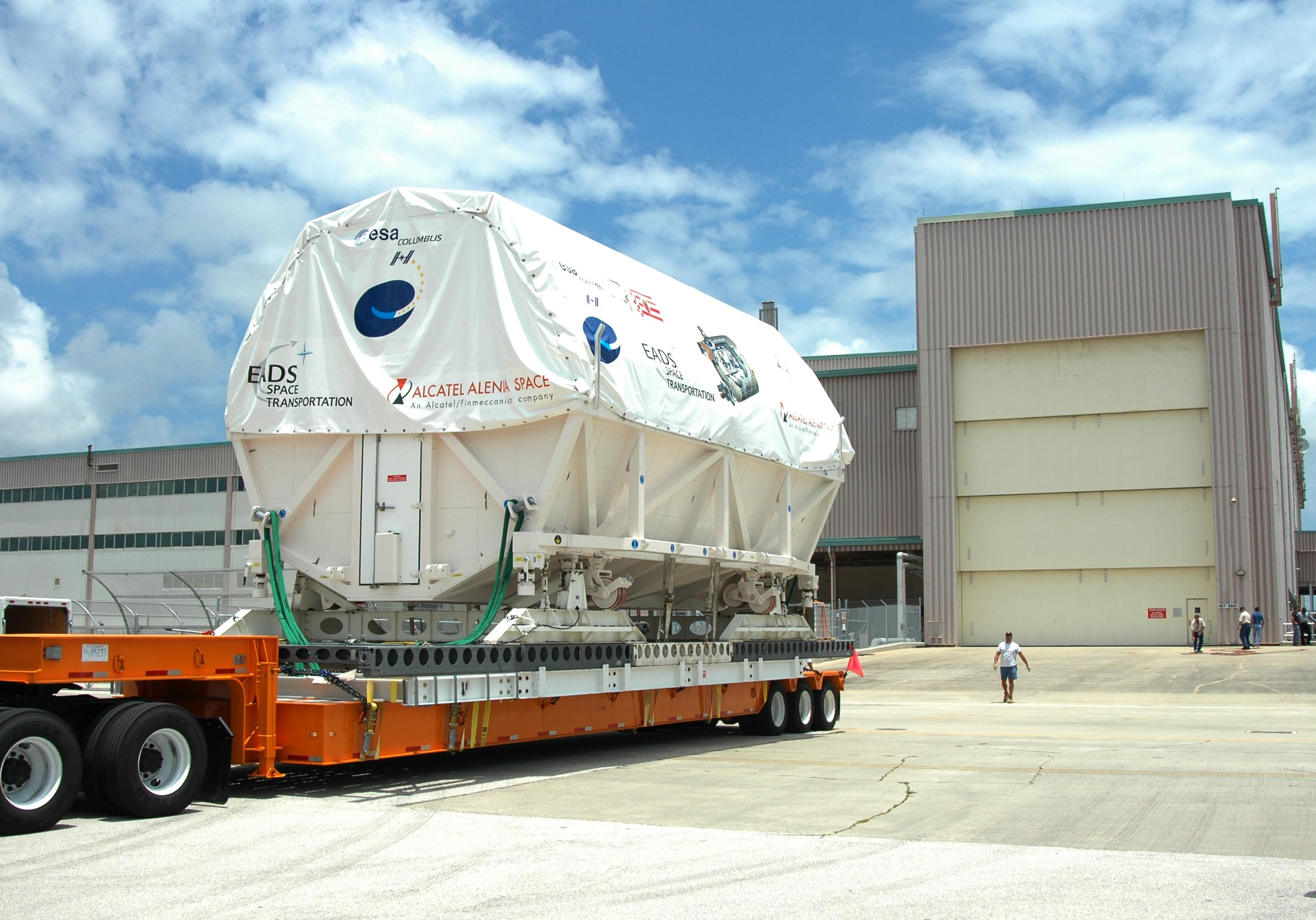
Columbus entering the SSPF loading yard for launch processing

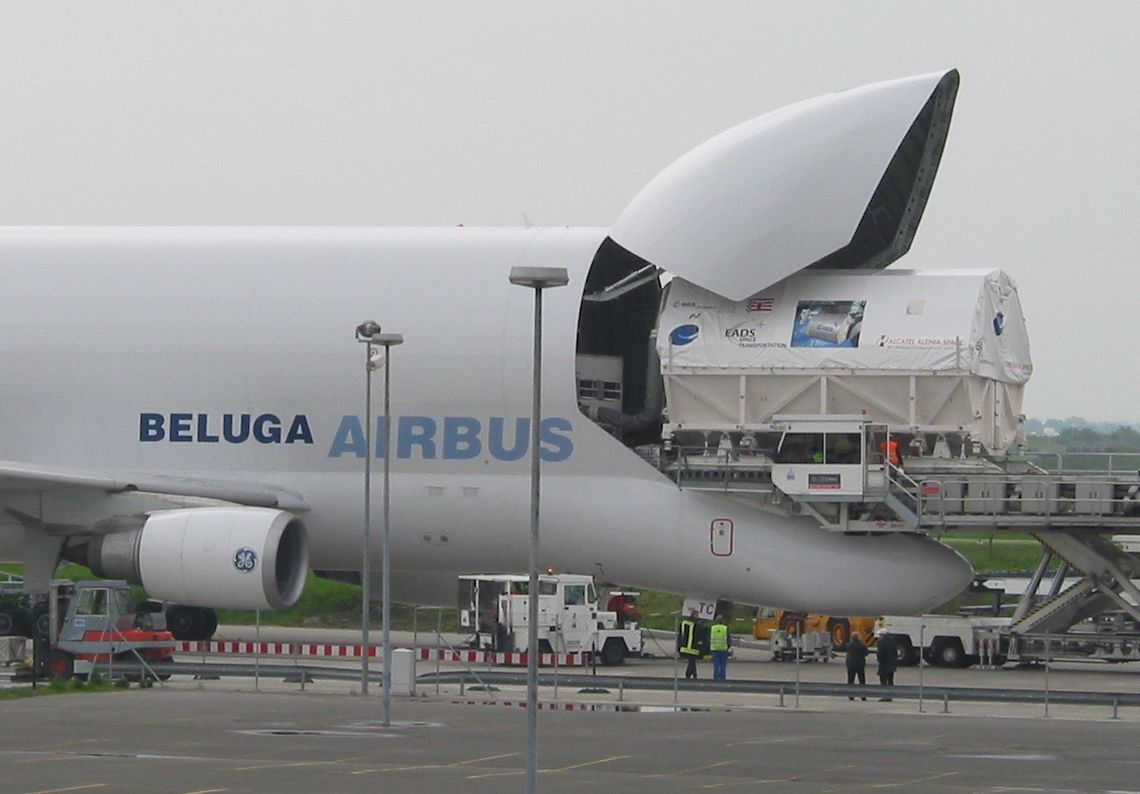
Airbus Beluga loading

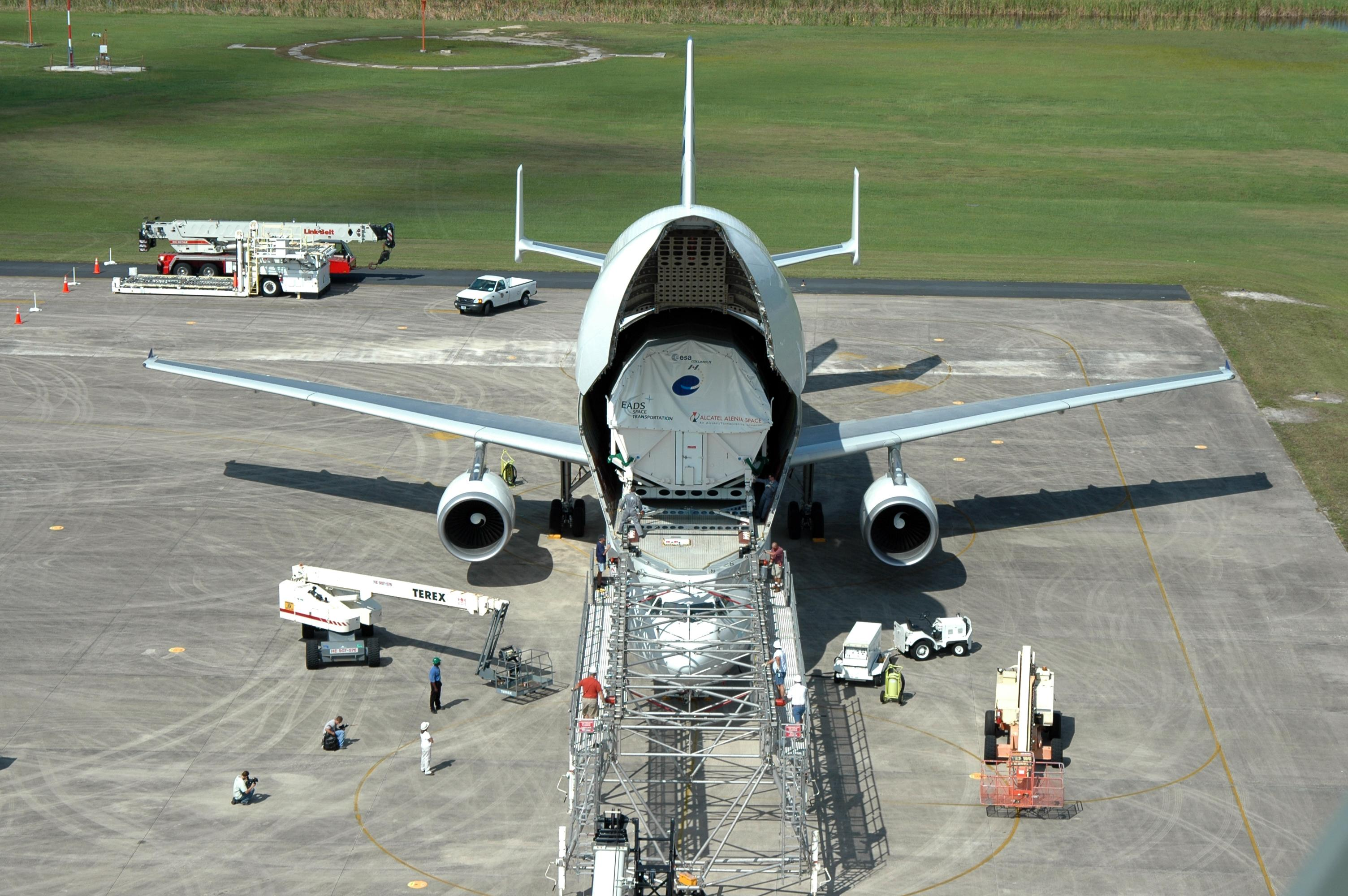
Unloading the Columbus module in its container at the shuttle landing facility

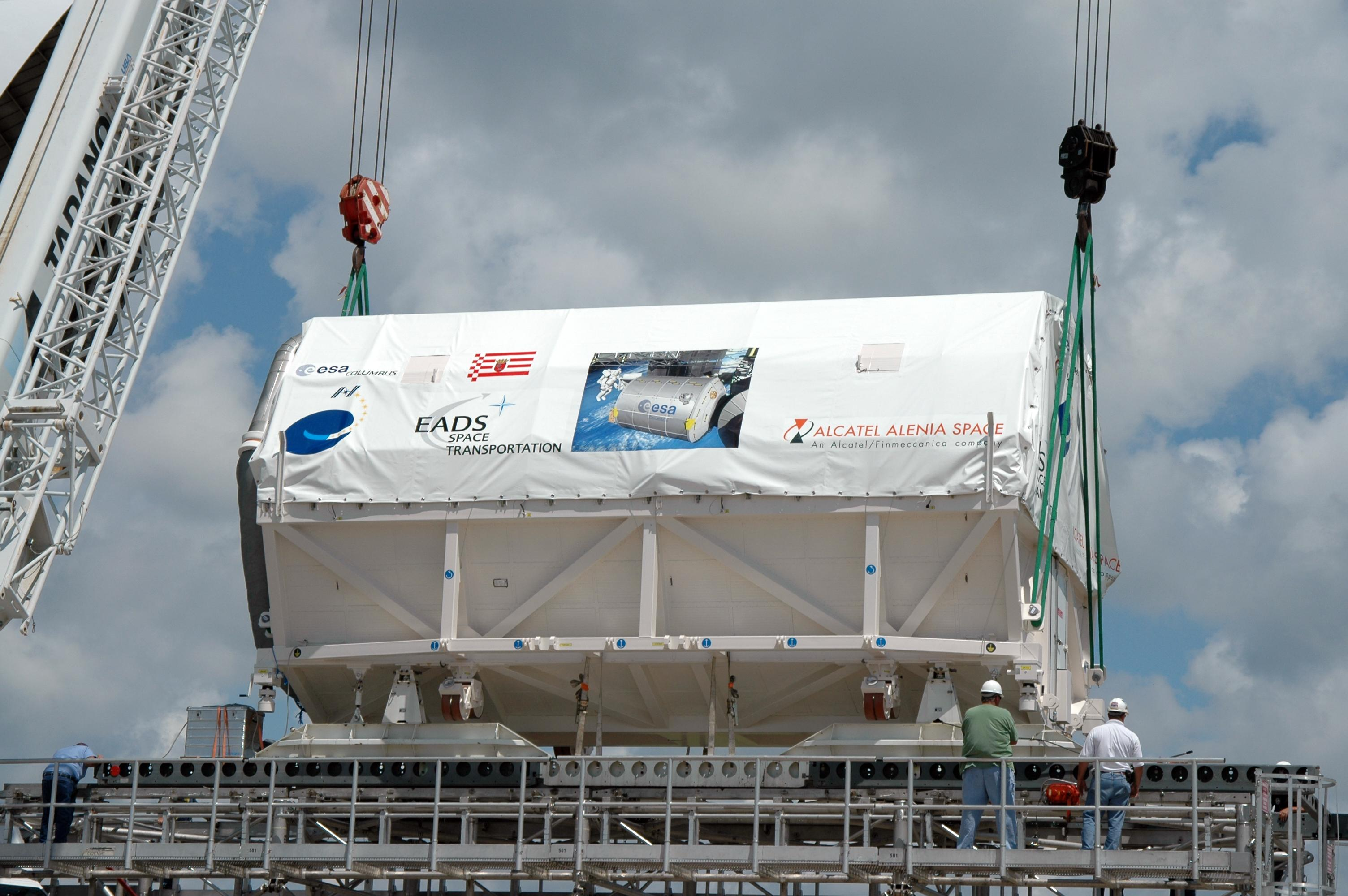
Transportation container

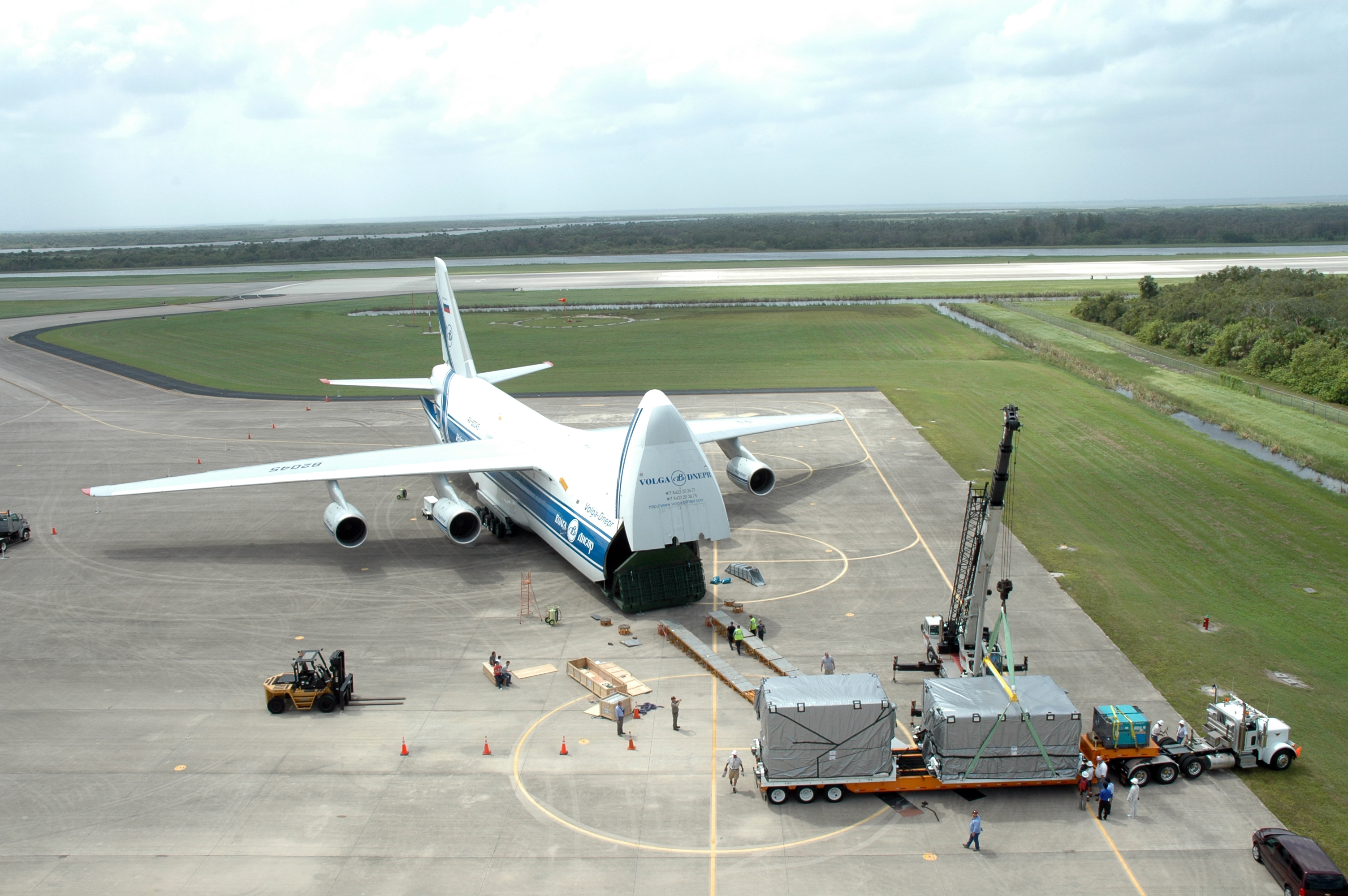
Antonov An-124 arrives at KSC with the Kibo module from the Tanegashima Space Center in Japan

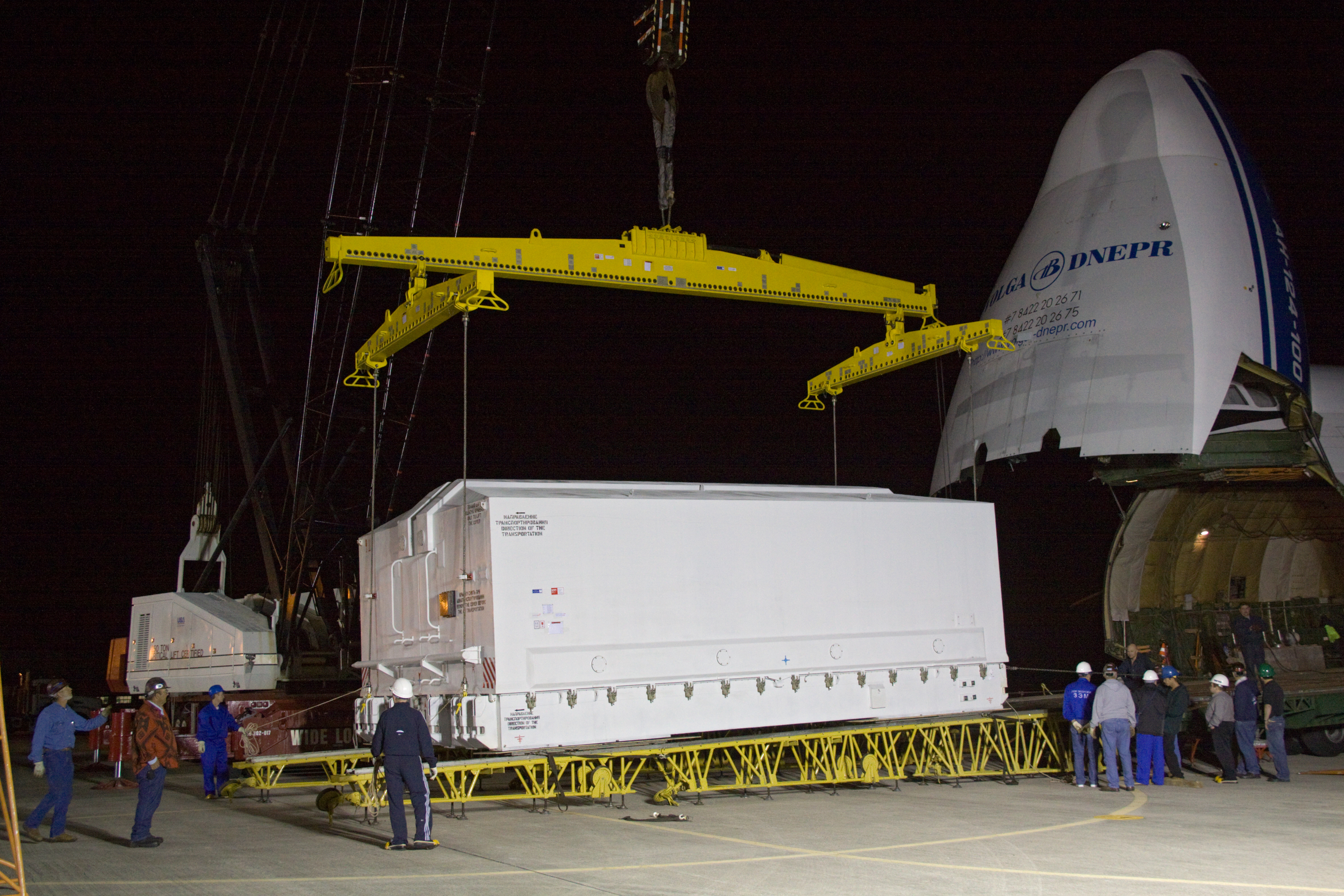
The Rassvet module in its container at KSC being unloaded from the Antonov 124 inbound from Khrunichev

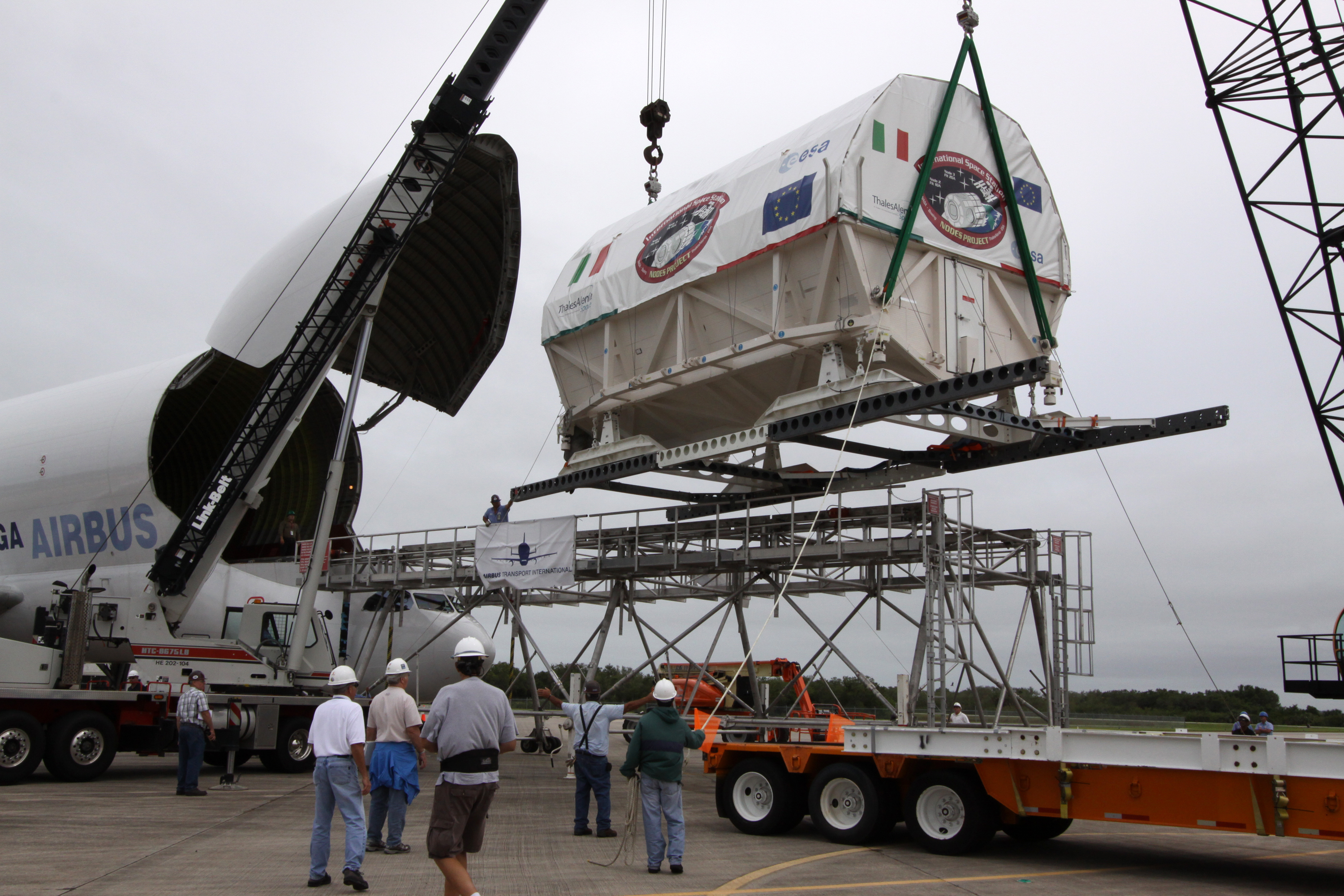
Node 3 being hoisted by cranes before loading onto truck

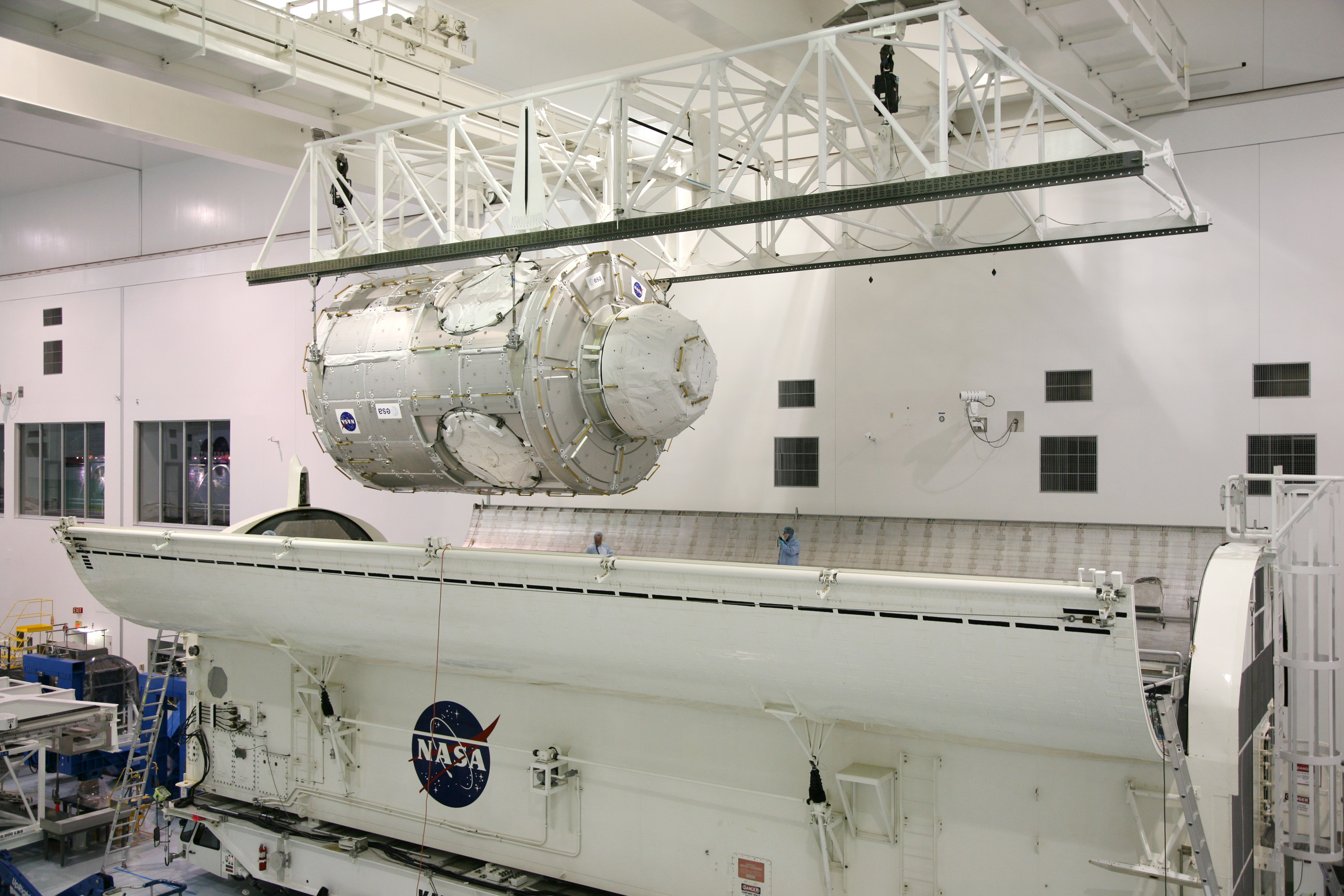
ISS payload transfer container

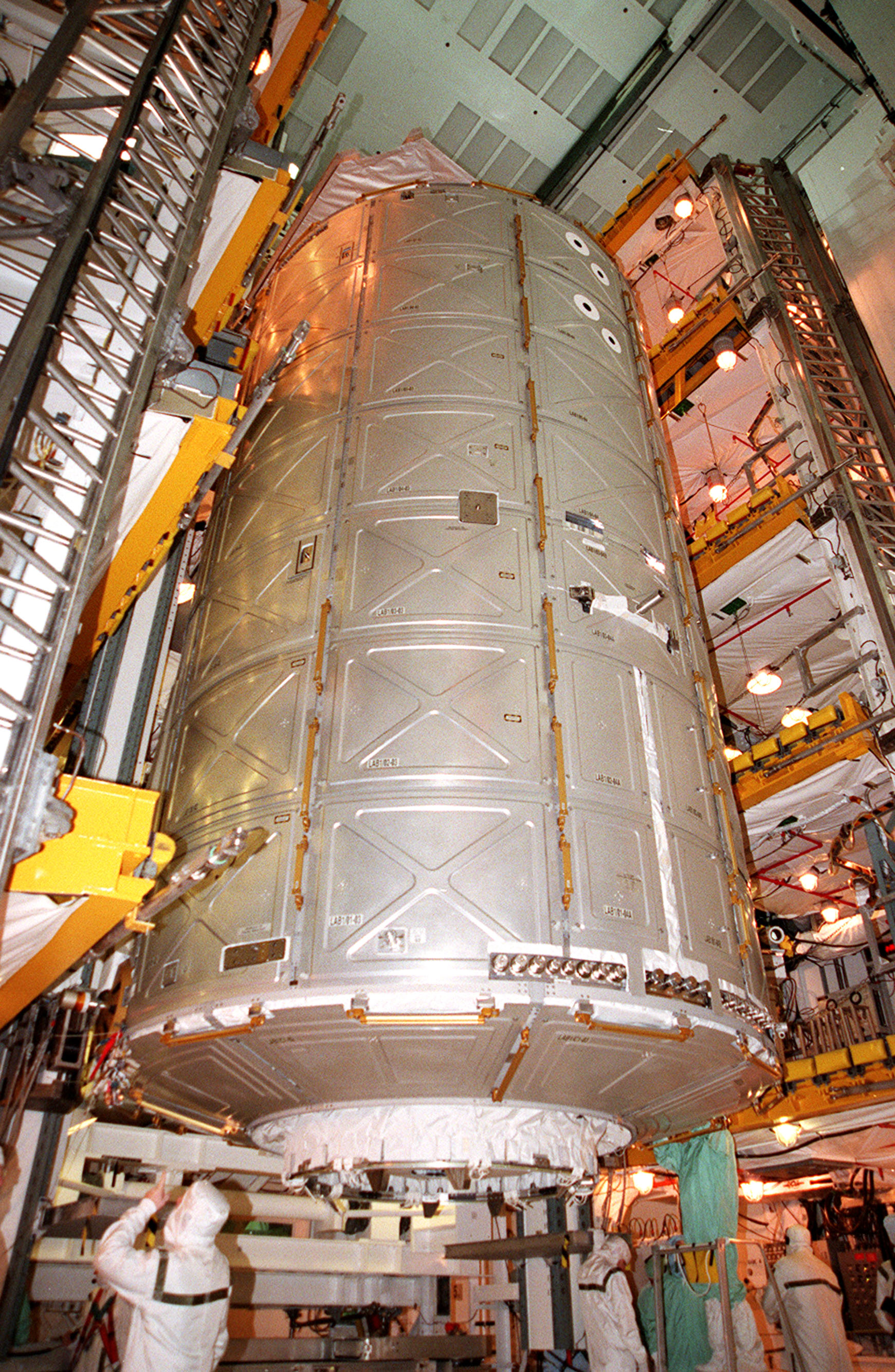
The US laboratory module being moved vertically from the payload transfer container to the Space Shuttle orbiter inside its installation structure

== Pre-launch processing and last stages of manufacturing ==
With the exception of all but one Russian-built module — Rassvet, all ISS components end up here at either one or both of these buildings at Kennedy Space Center.

=== Space Station Processing Facility ===
At the SSPF, ISS modules, trusses and solar arrays are prepped and made ready for launch. In this iconic building are two large 100,000 class clean work environment areas. Workers and engineers wear full non-contaminant clothing while working. Modules receive cleaning and polishing, and some areas are temporarily disassembled for the installation of cables, electrical systems and plumbing. Steel truss parts and module panels are assembled together with screws, bolts and connectors, some with insulation. In another area, shipments of spare materials are available for installation. International Standard Payload Rack frames are assembled and welded together, allowing the installation of instruments, machines and science experiment boxes to be fitted. Once racks are fully assembled, they are hoisted by a special manually operated robotic crane and carefully maneuvered into place inside the space station modules. Each rack weighs from 700 to 1,100 kg, and connect inside the module on special mounts with screws and latches.

Cargo bags for MPLM modules were filled with their cargo such as food packages, science experiments and other miscellaneous items on-site in the SSPF, and were loaded into the module by the same robotic crane and strapped in securely.

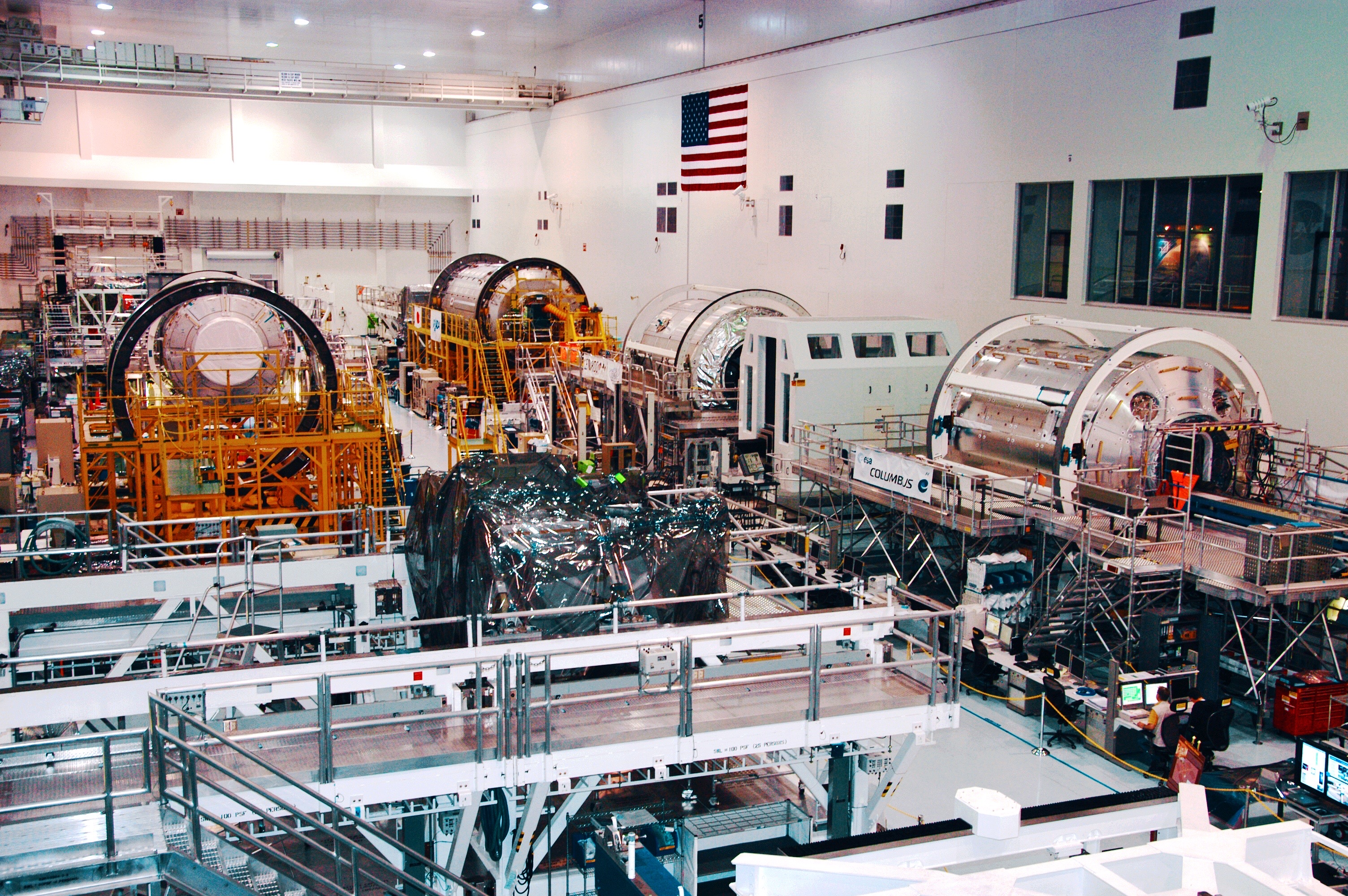
Overview of the SSPF factory floor filled with space station modules

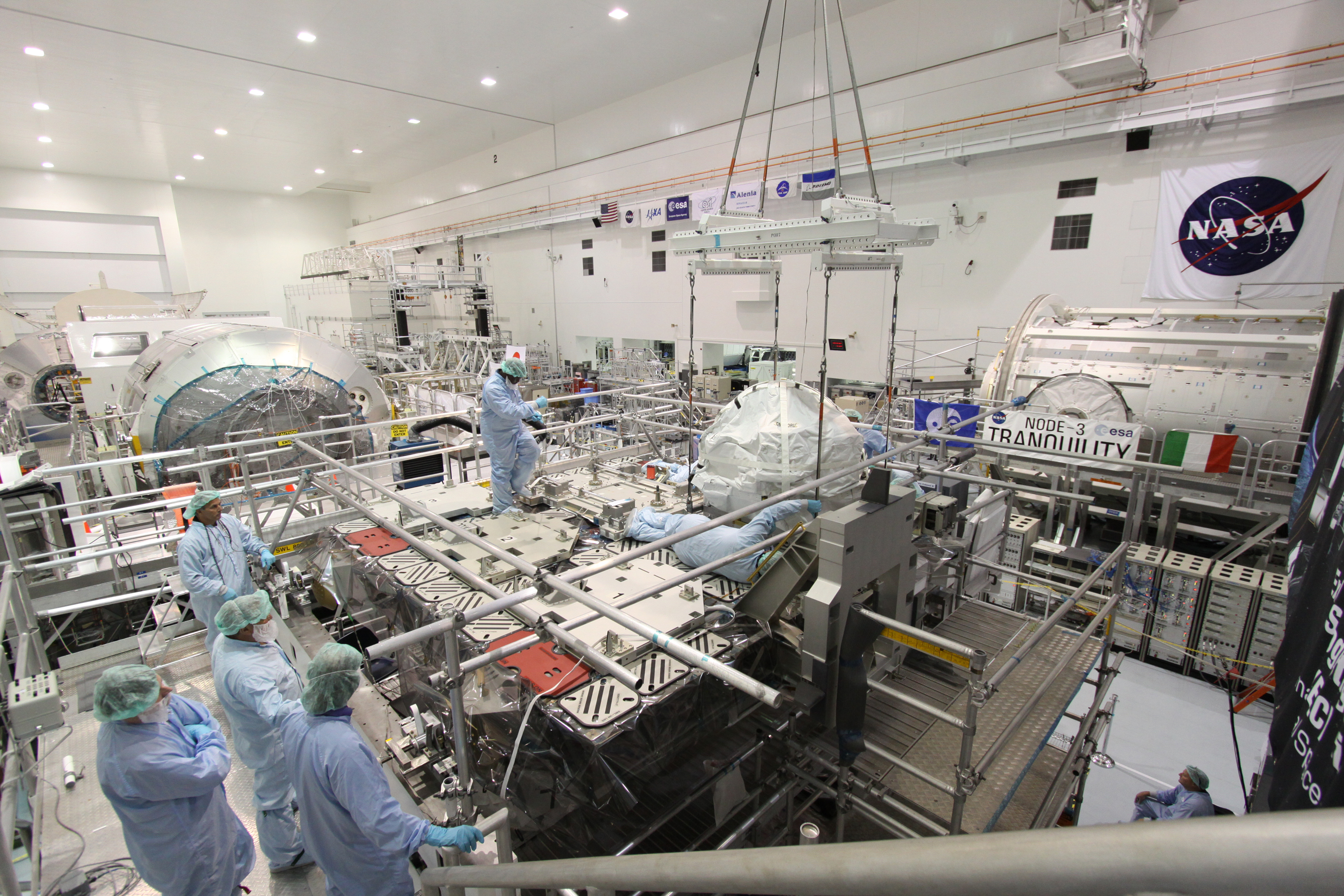
ExPRESS logistics carrier assembly

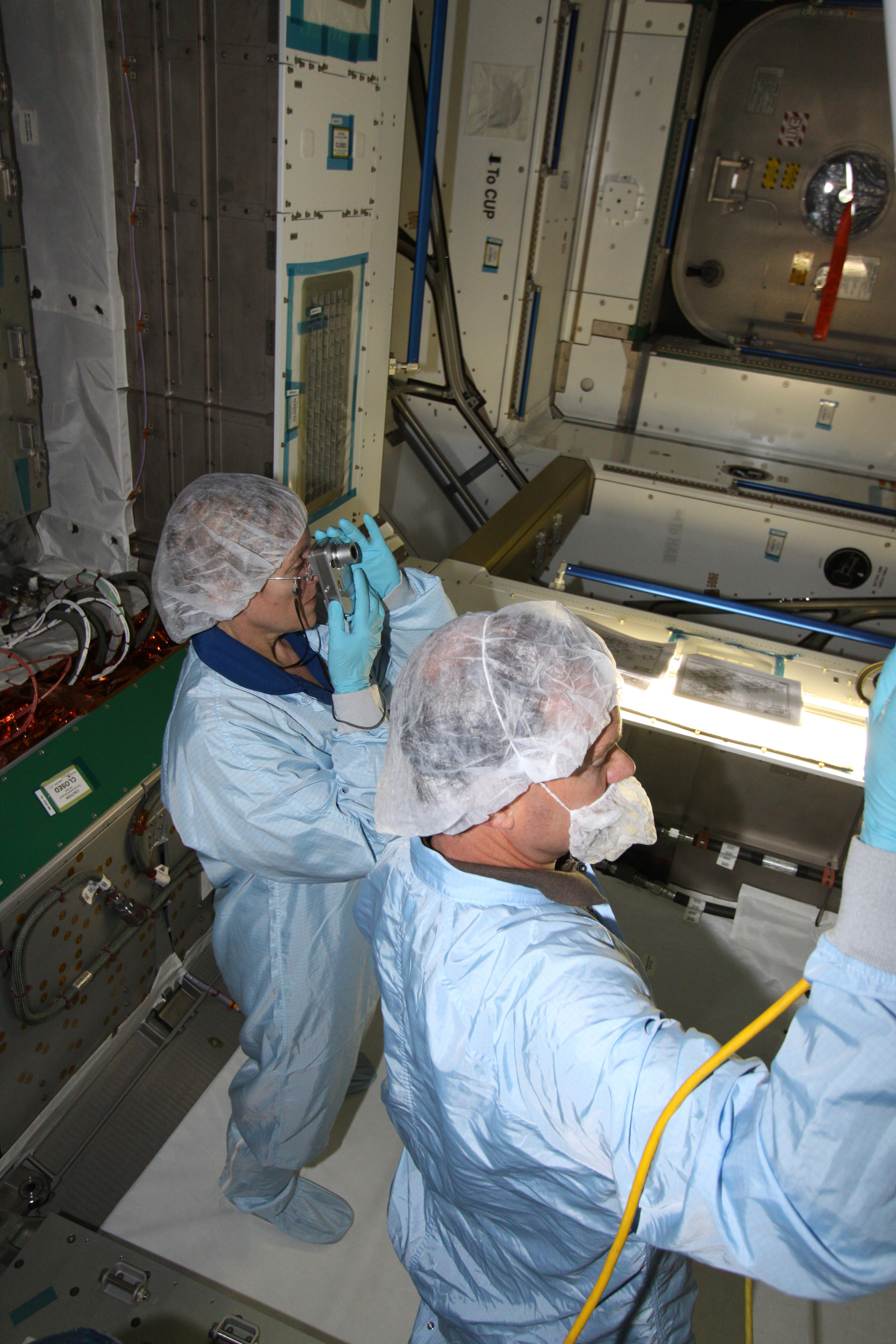
Workers in protective clothing inspect and clean the interior of Node 3

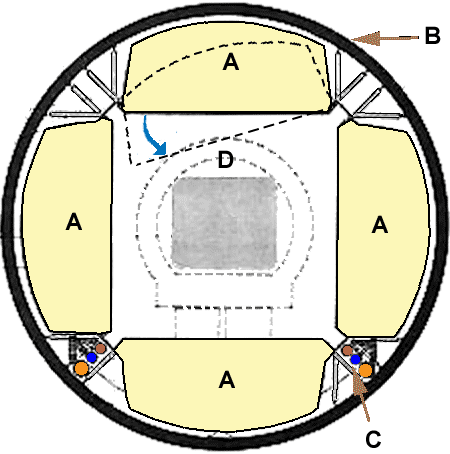
ISPR rack configuration in a typical module

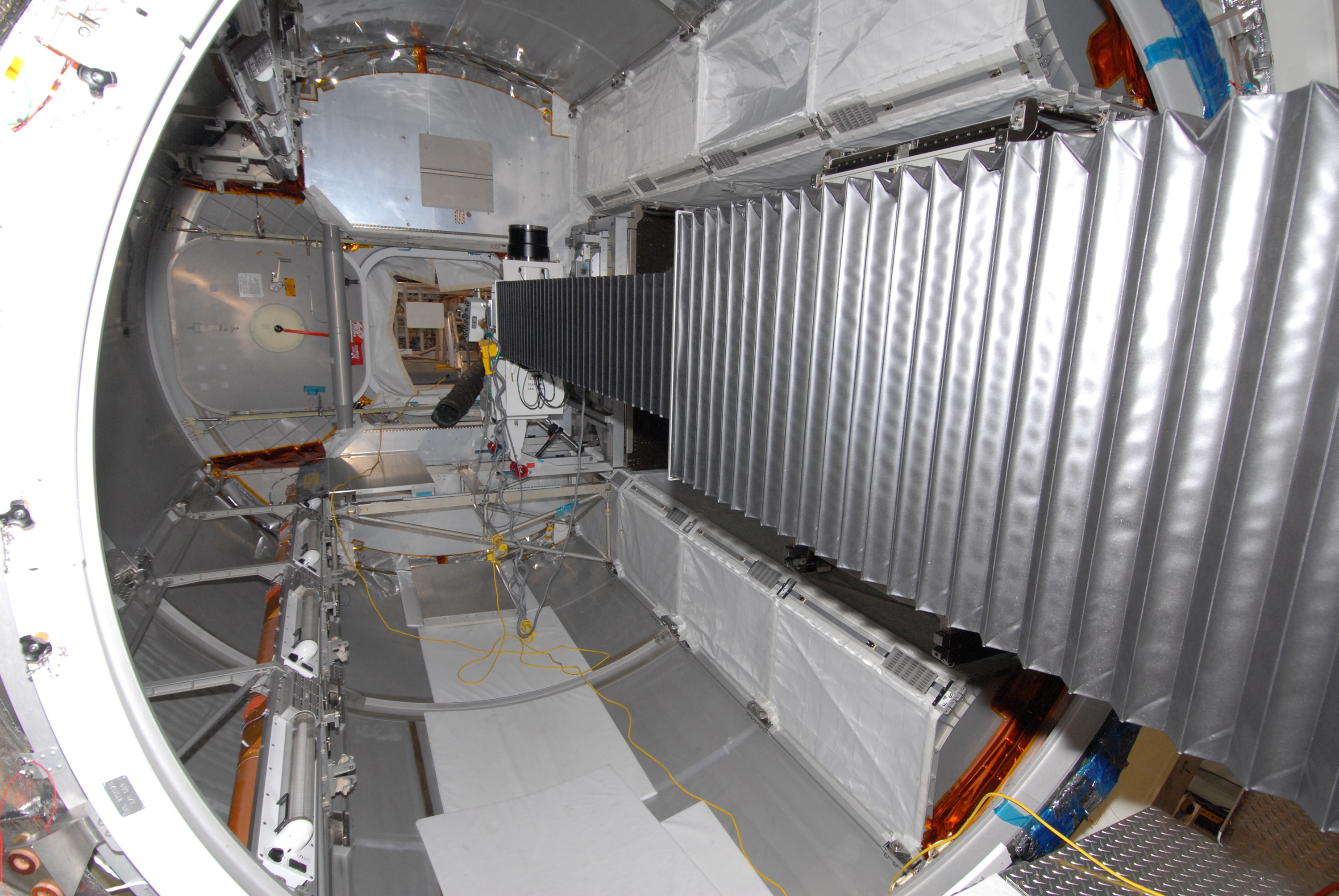
Robotic crane arm loading cargo bags in an MPLM

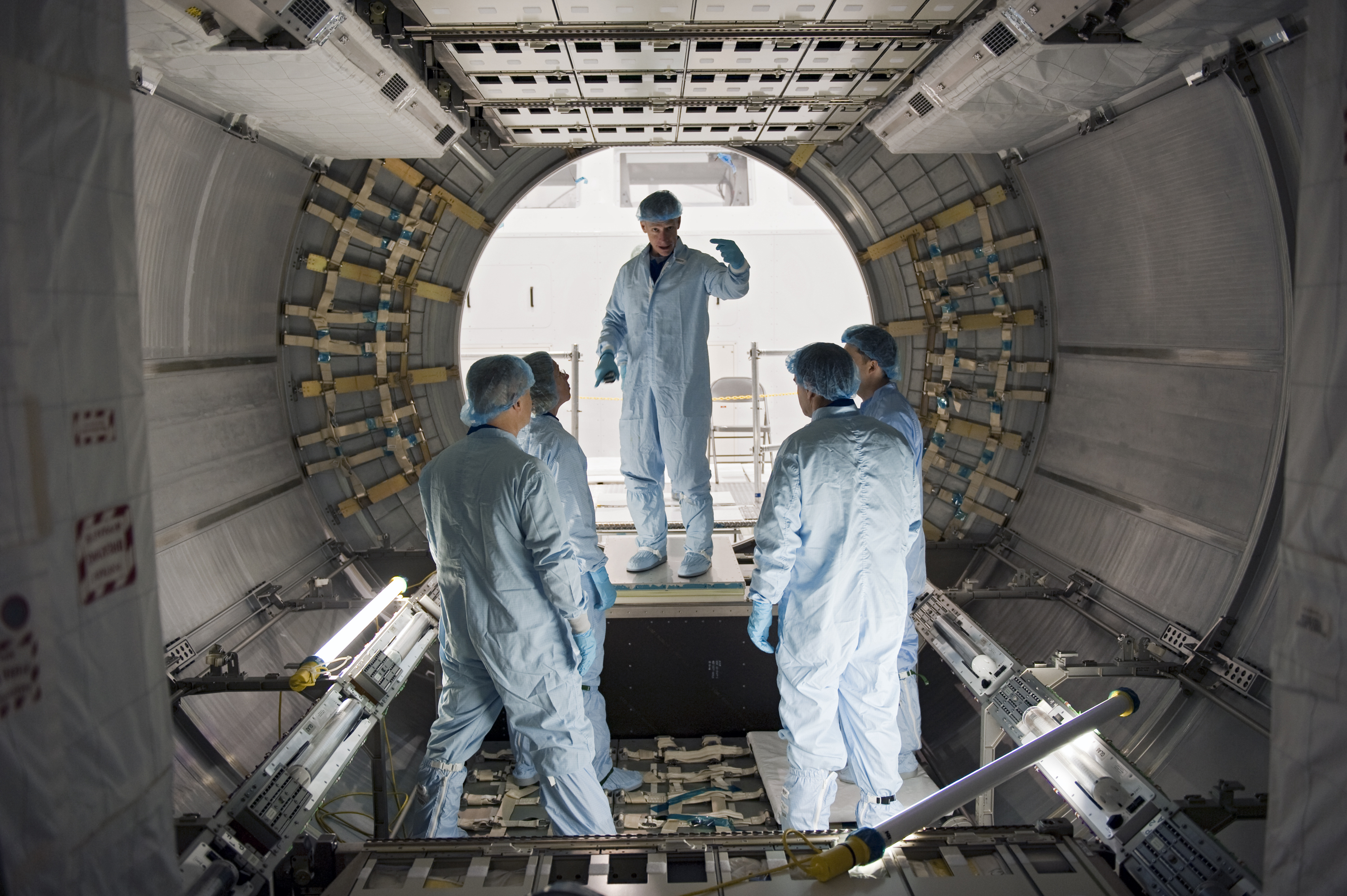
Workers fitting and inspecting the rack mounts

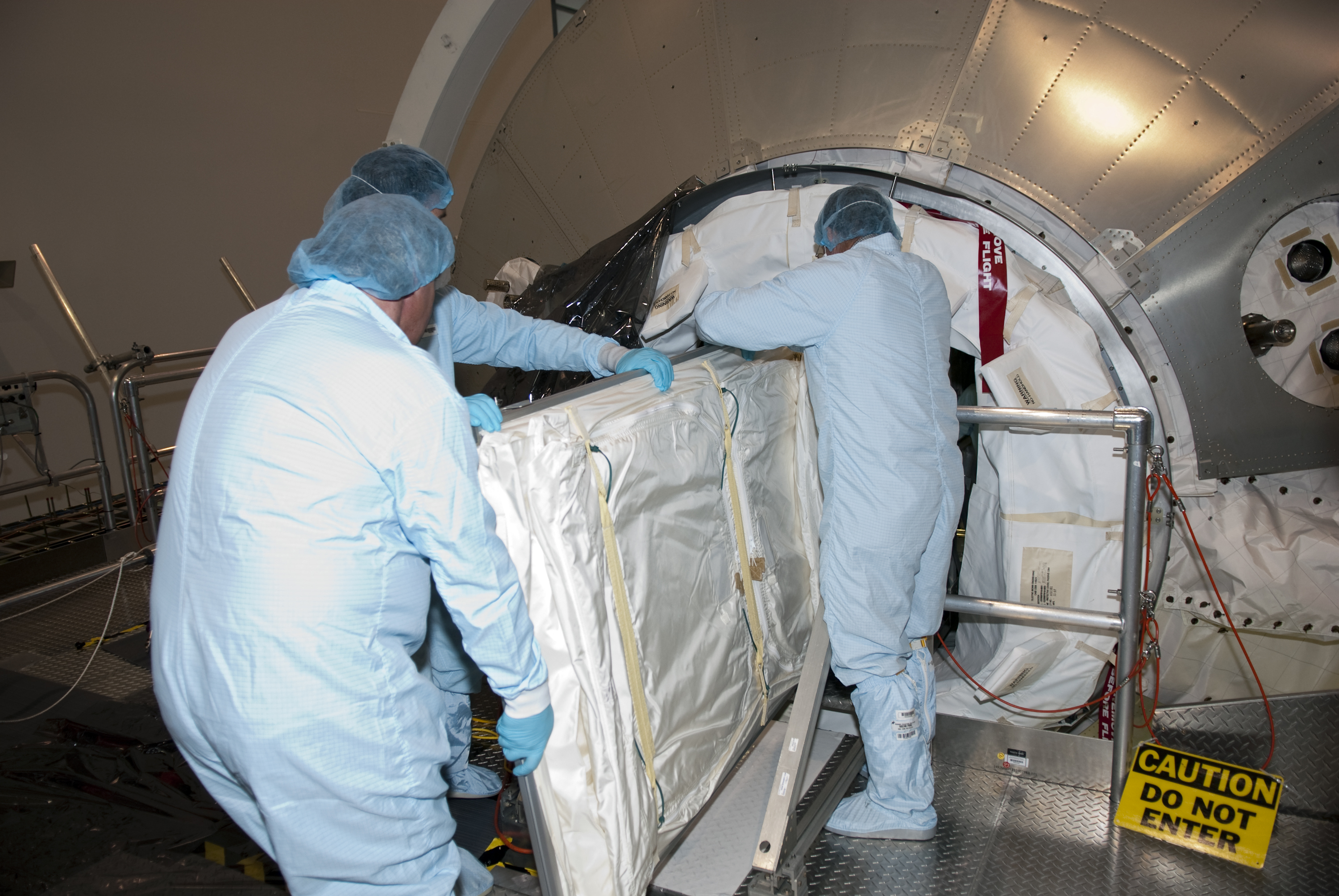
Workers loading rack covers

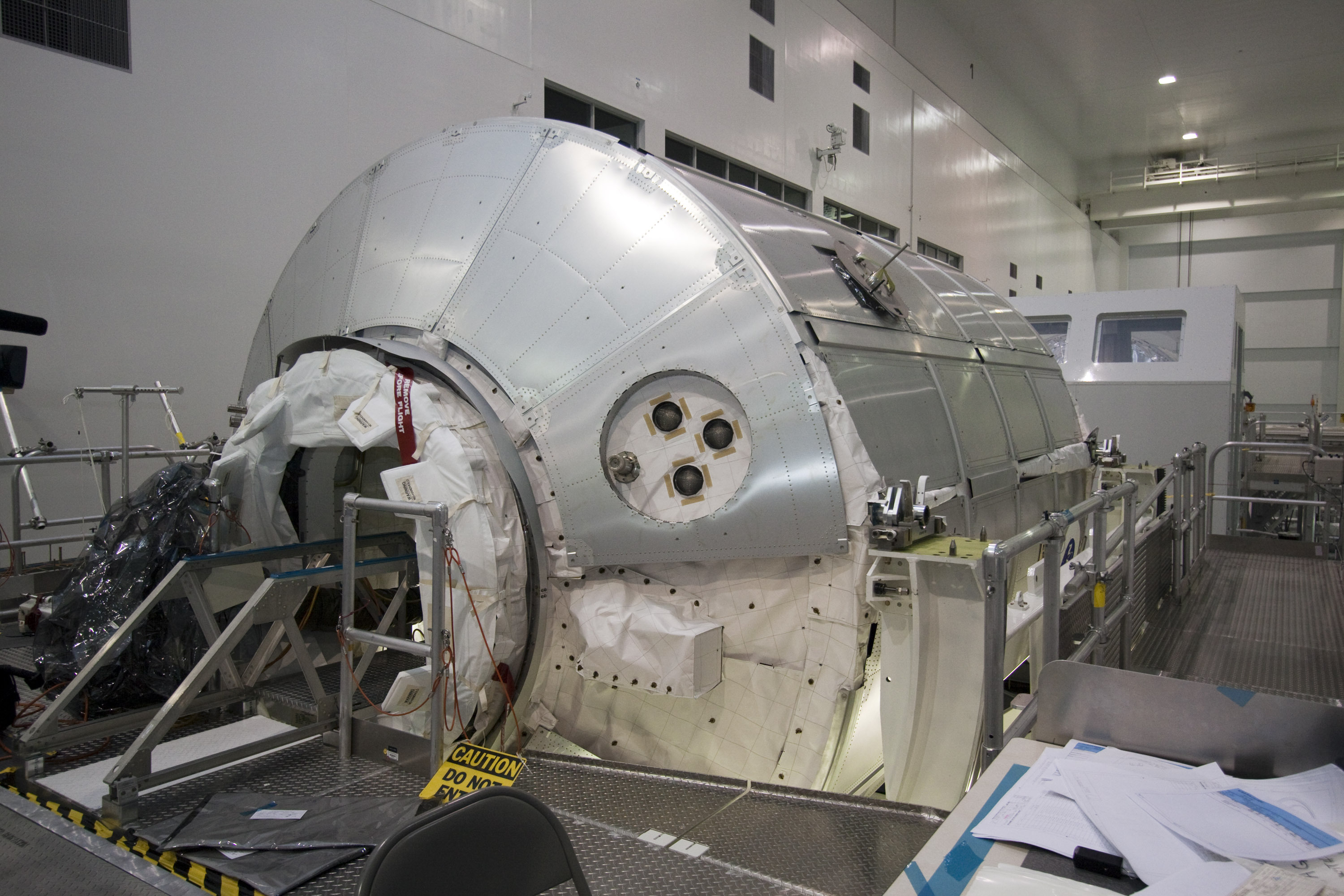
Leonardo MPLM in its housing jig

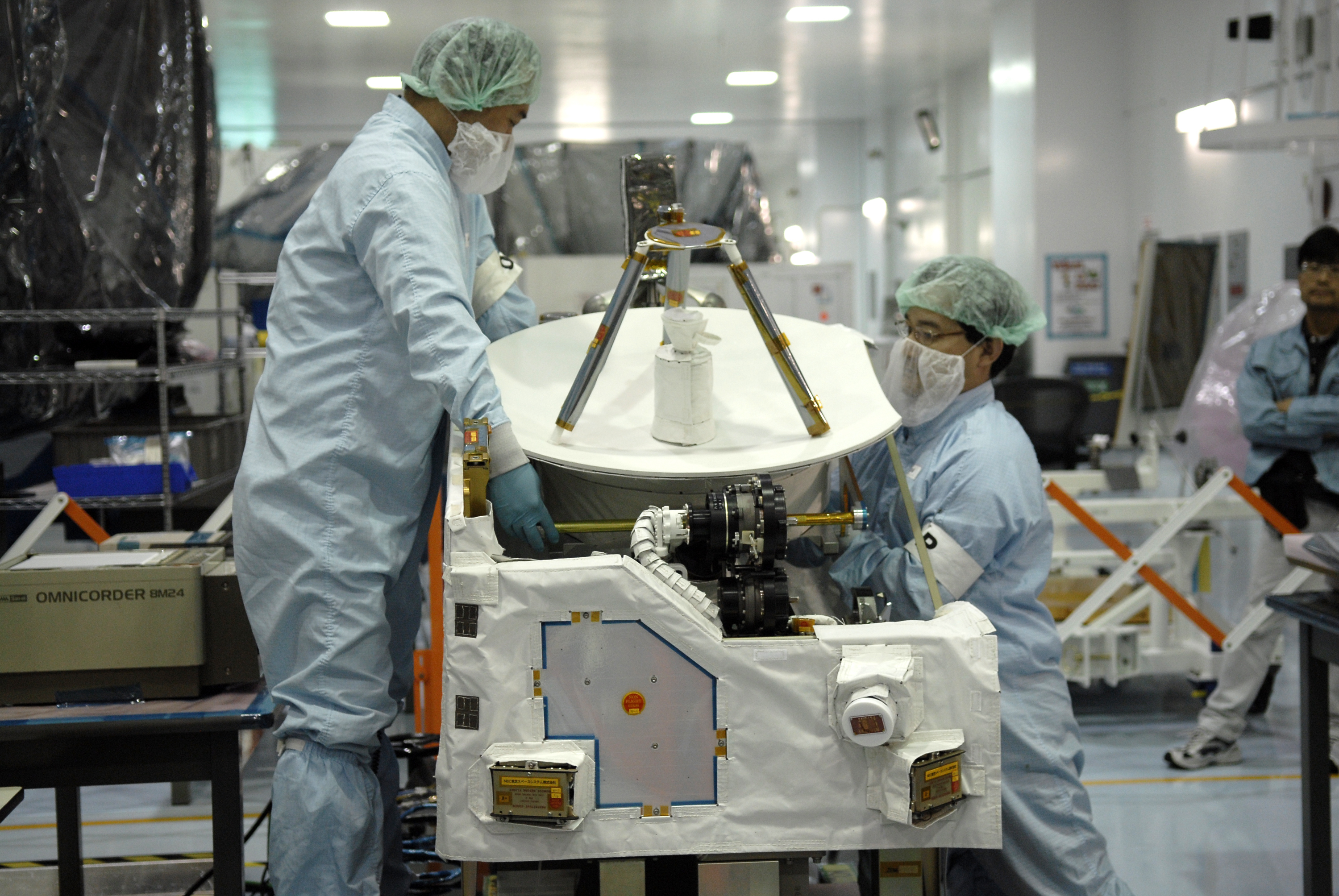
Checking and testing the antenna

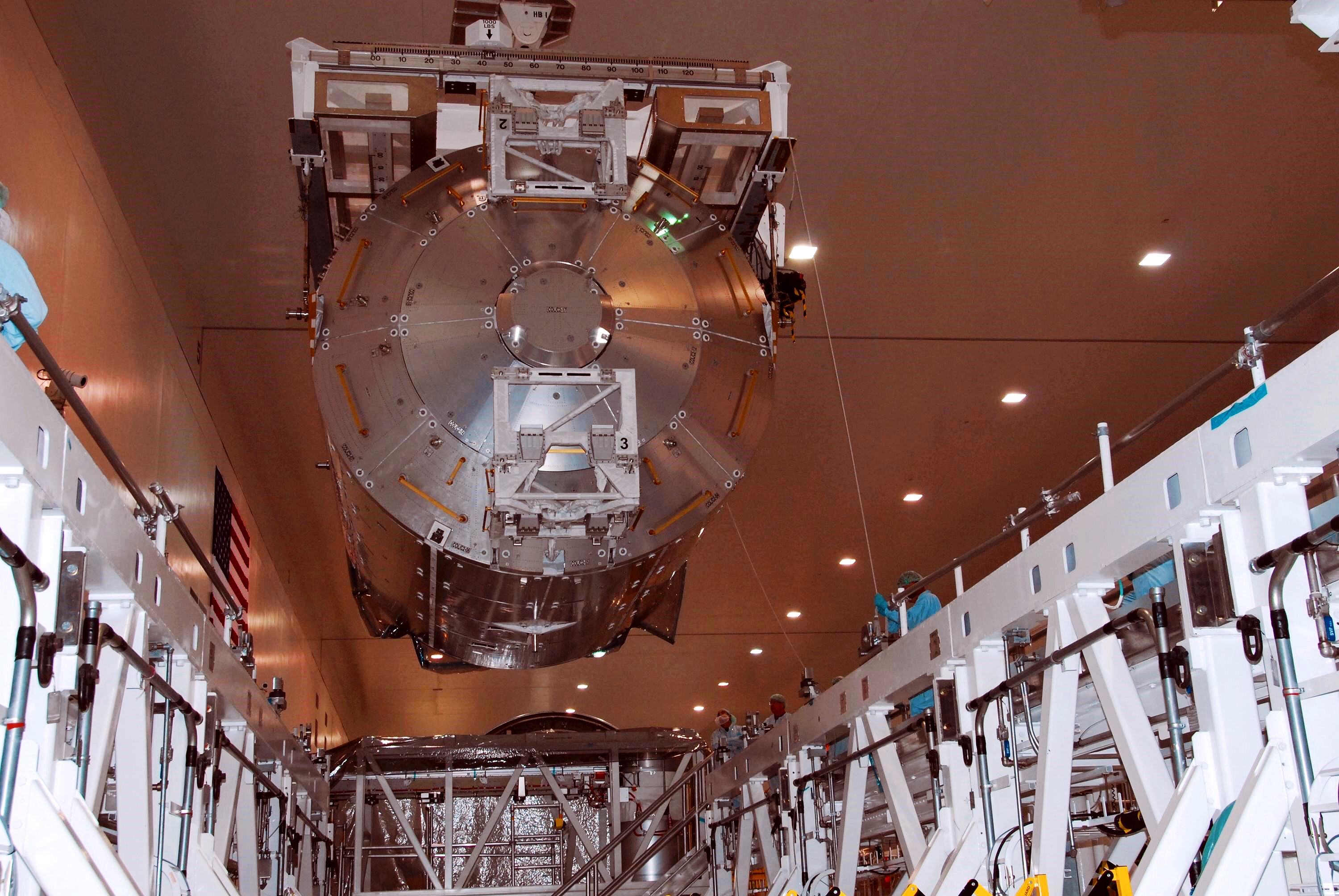
Columbus being hoisted to a manufacturing weigh stand

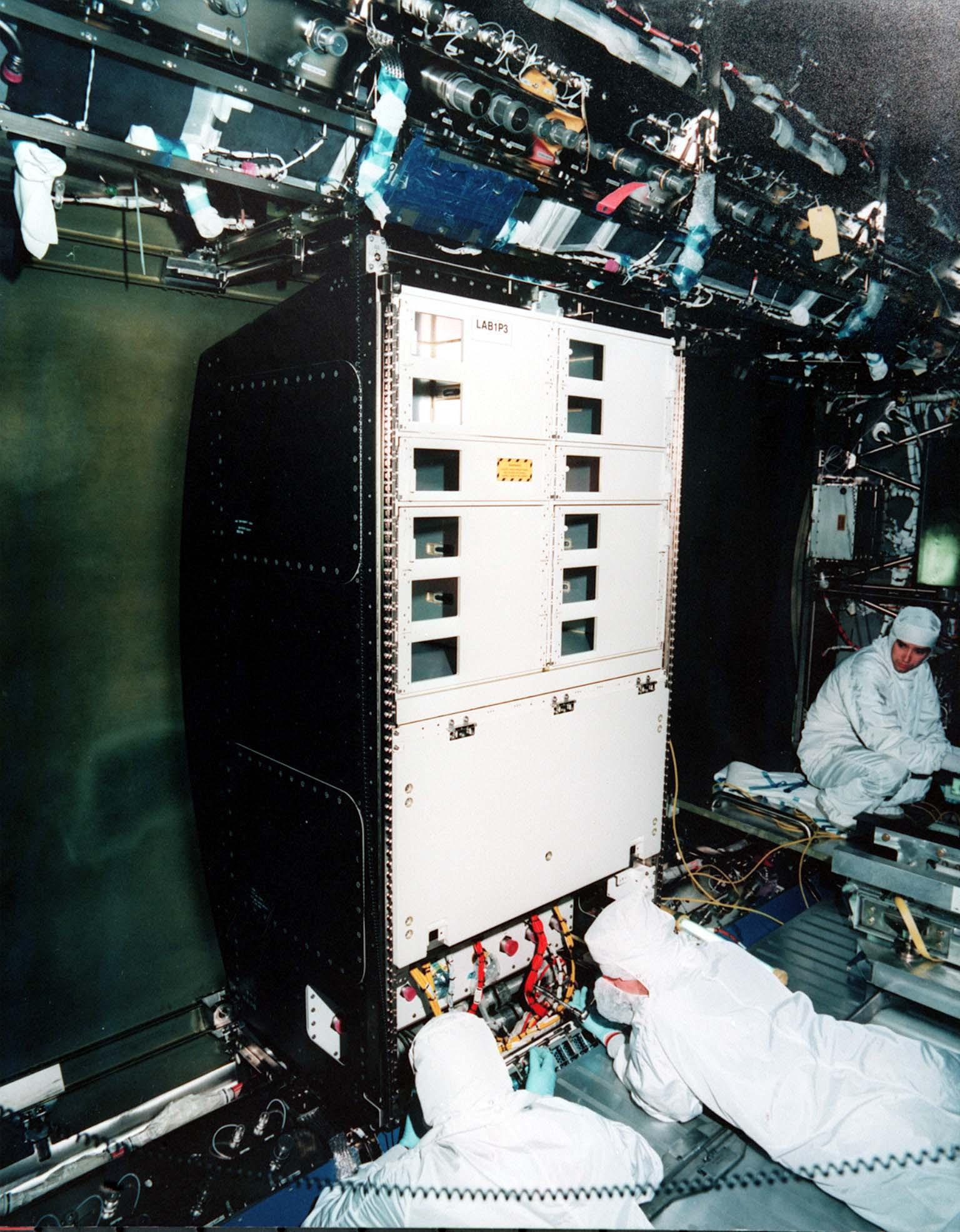
A rack being fitted in the Destiny laboratory

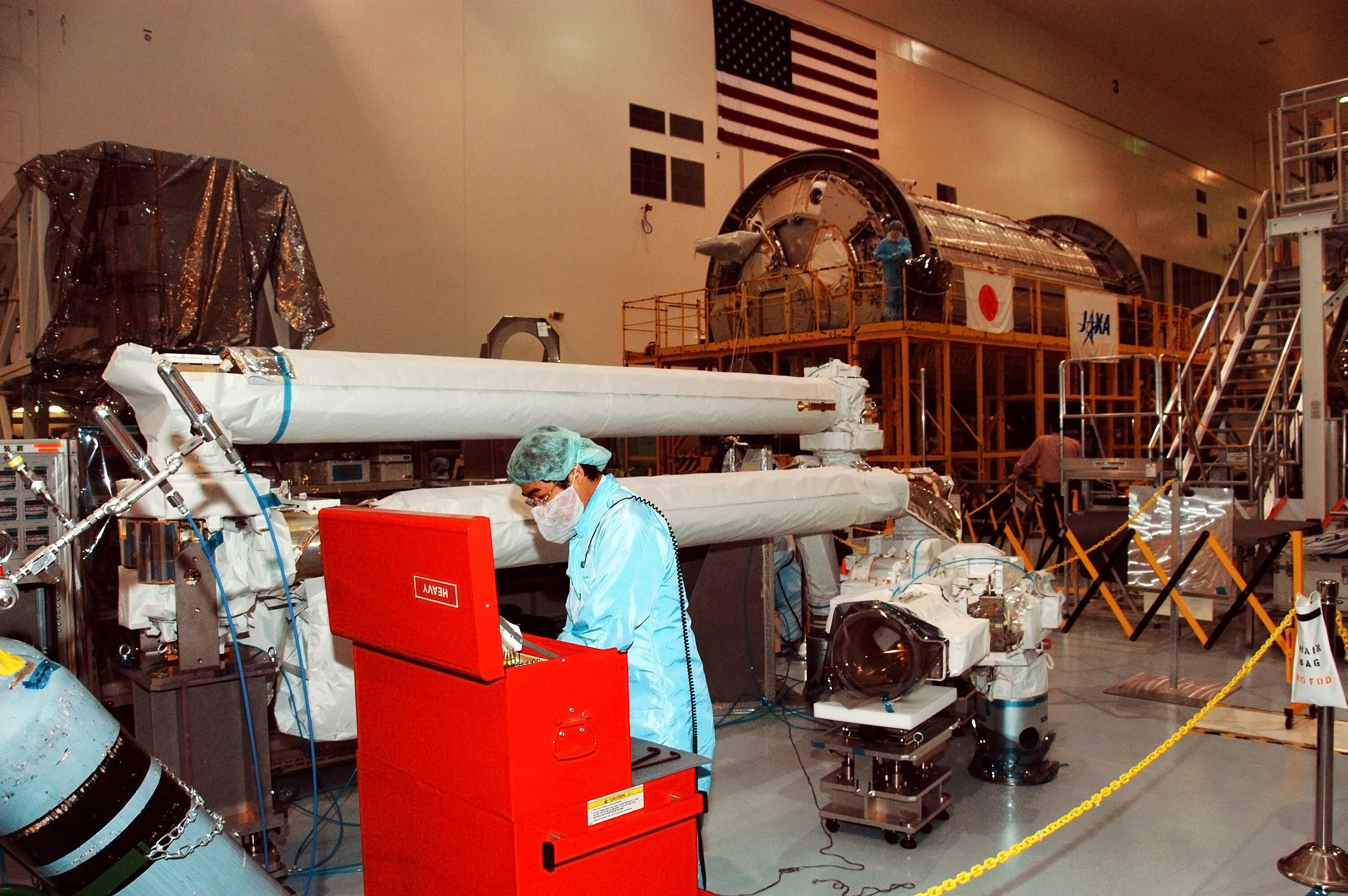
A worker assembles parts for the Japanese Experiment Module and its robotic arm

=== Operations and Checkout Building ===
Adjacent to the Space Station Processing Facility, the Operations and Checkout Building's spacecraft workshop is used for testing of the space station modules in a vacuum chamber to check for leaks which can be repaired on-site. Additionally, systems checking on various electrical elements and machines is conducted. Similar processing operations to the SSPF are conducted in this building if the SSPF area is full, or certain stages of preparation can only be done in the O&C.

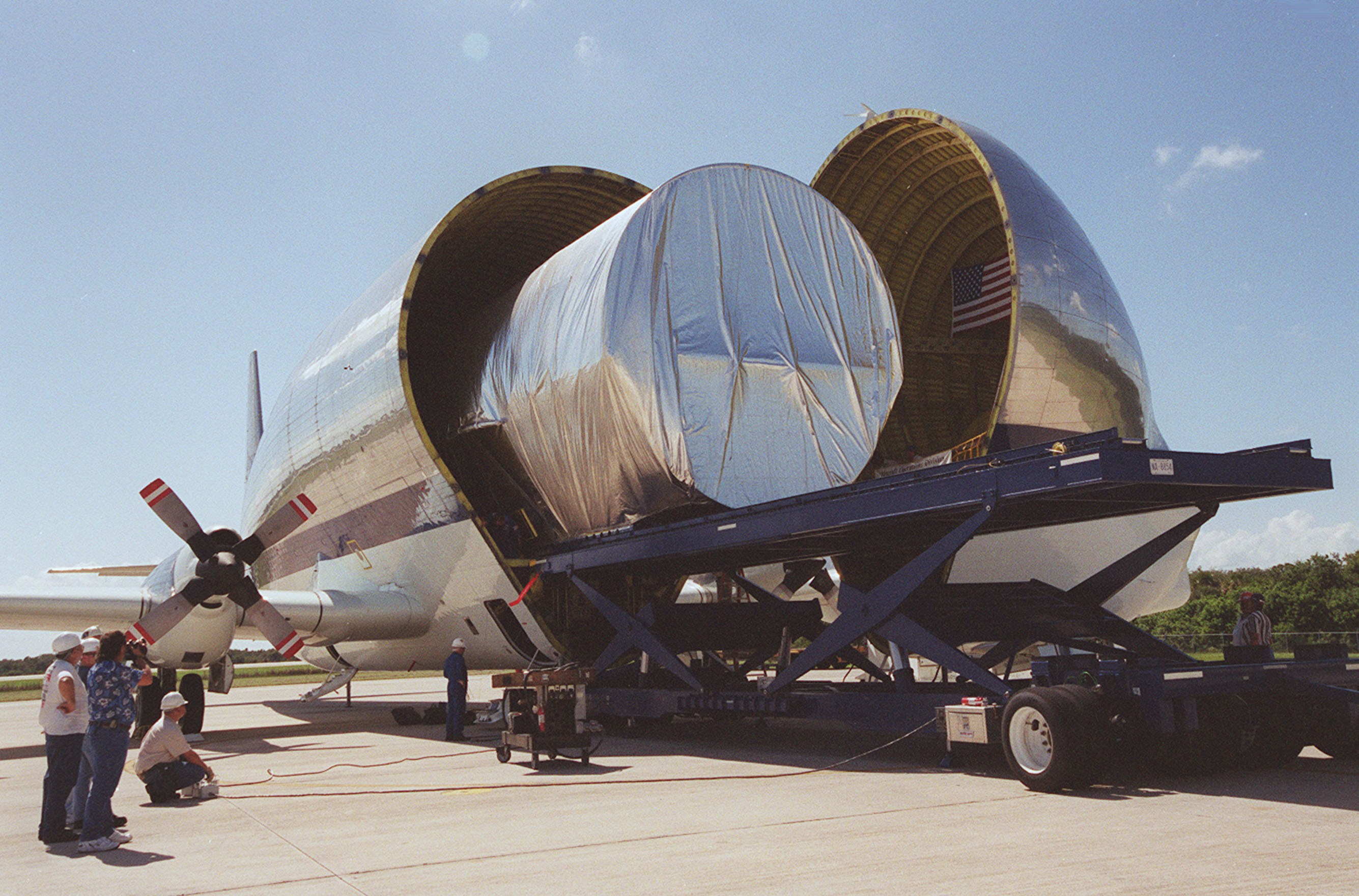
Quest airlock arriving at KSC on its way to the O&C building

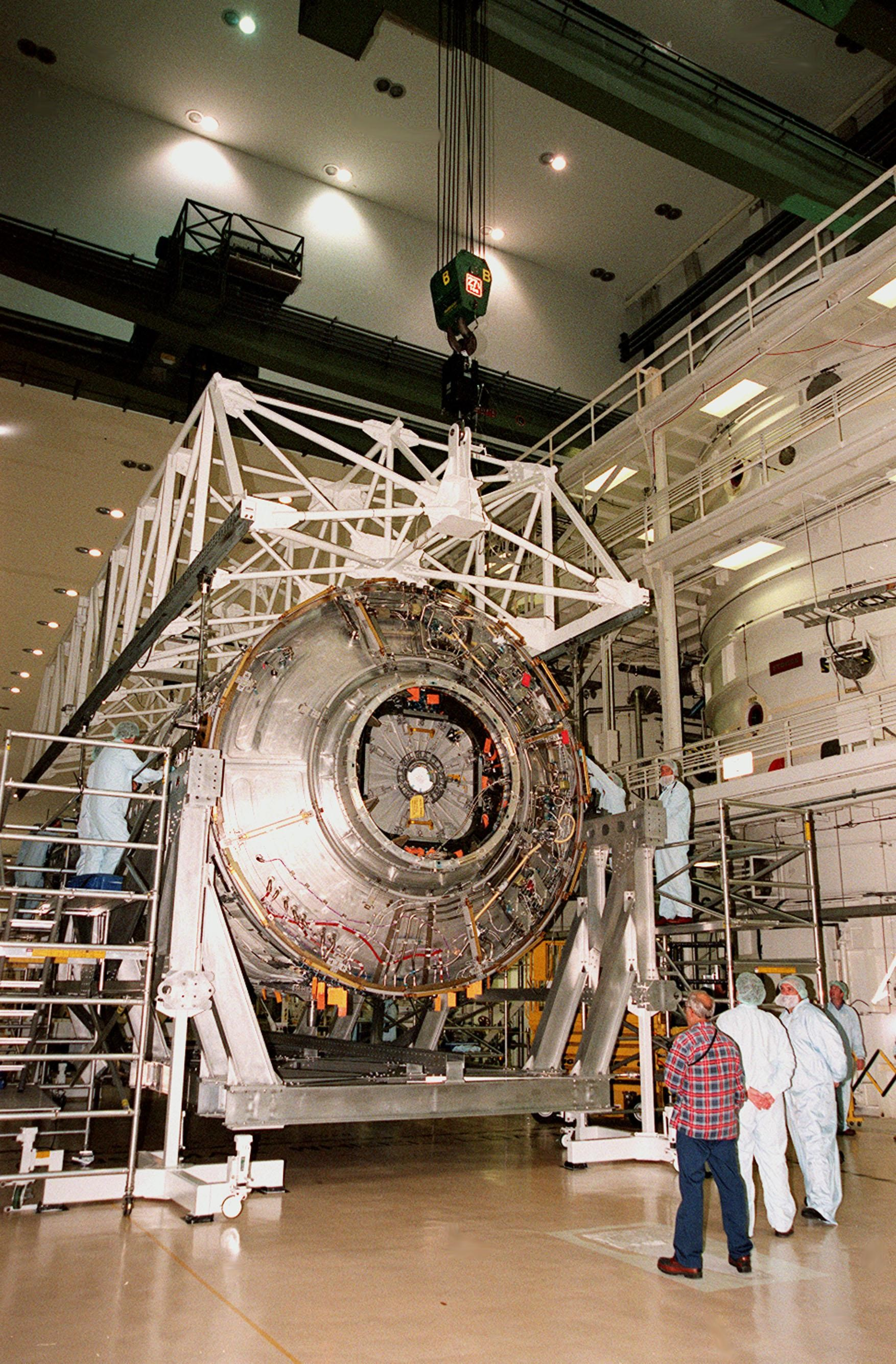
US lab

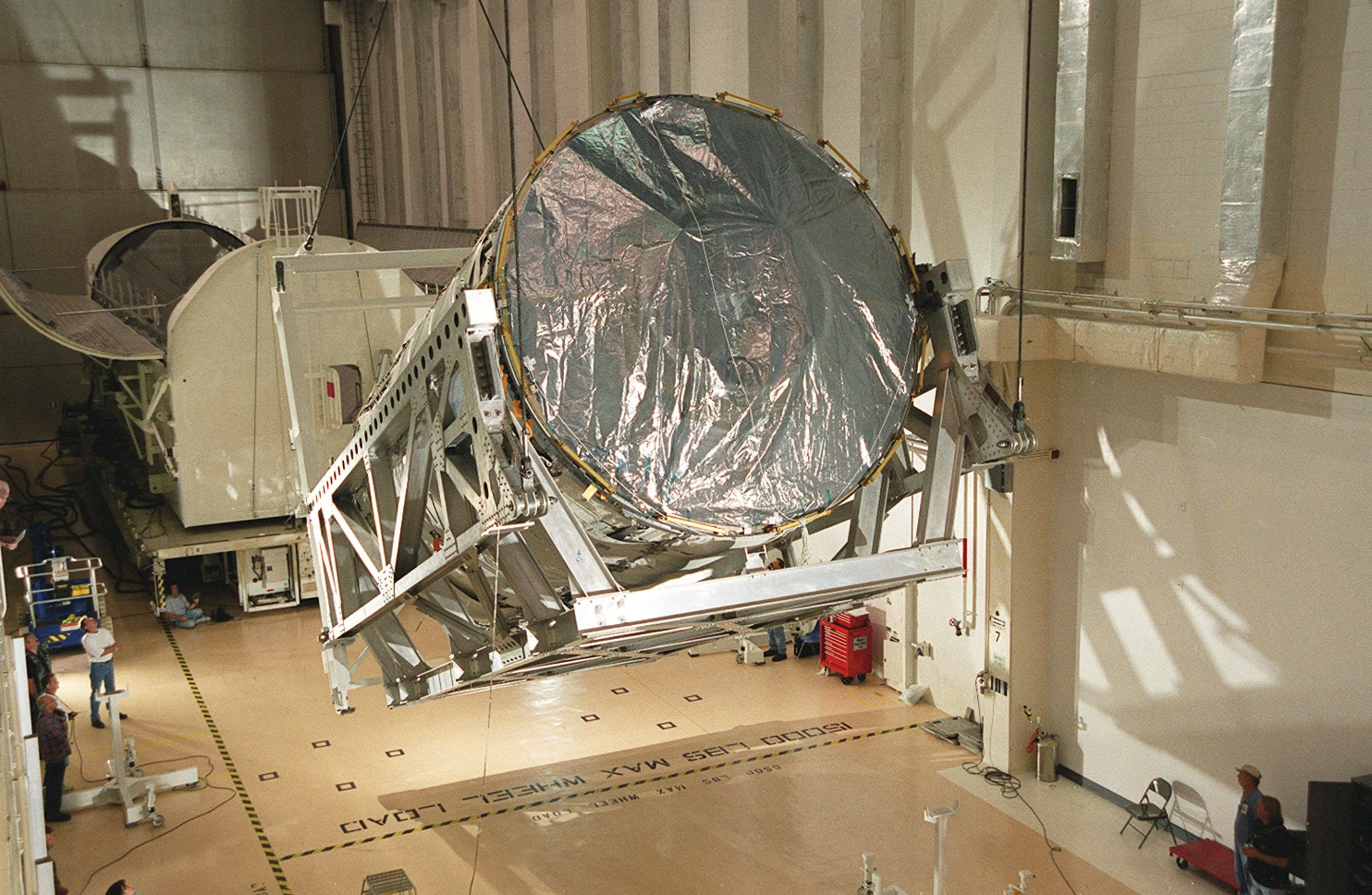
US lab unloaded from its container

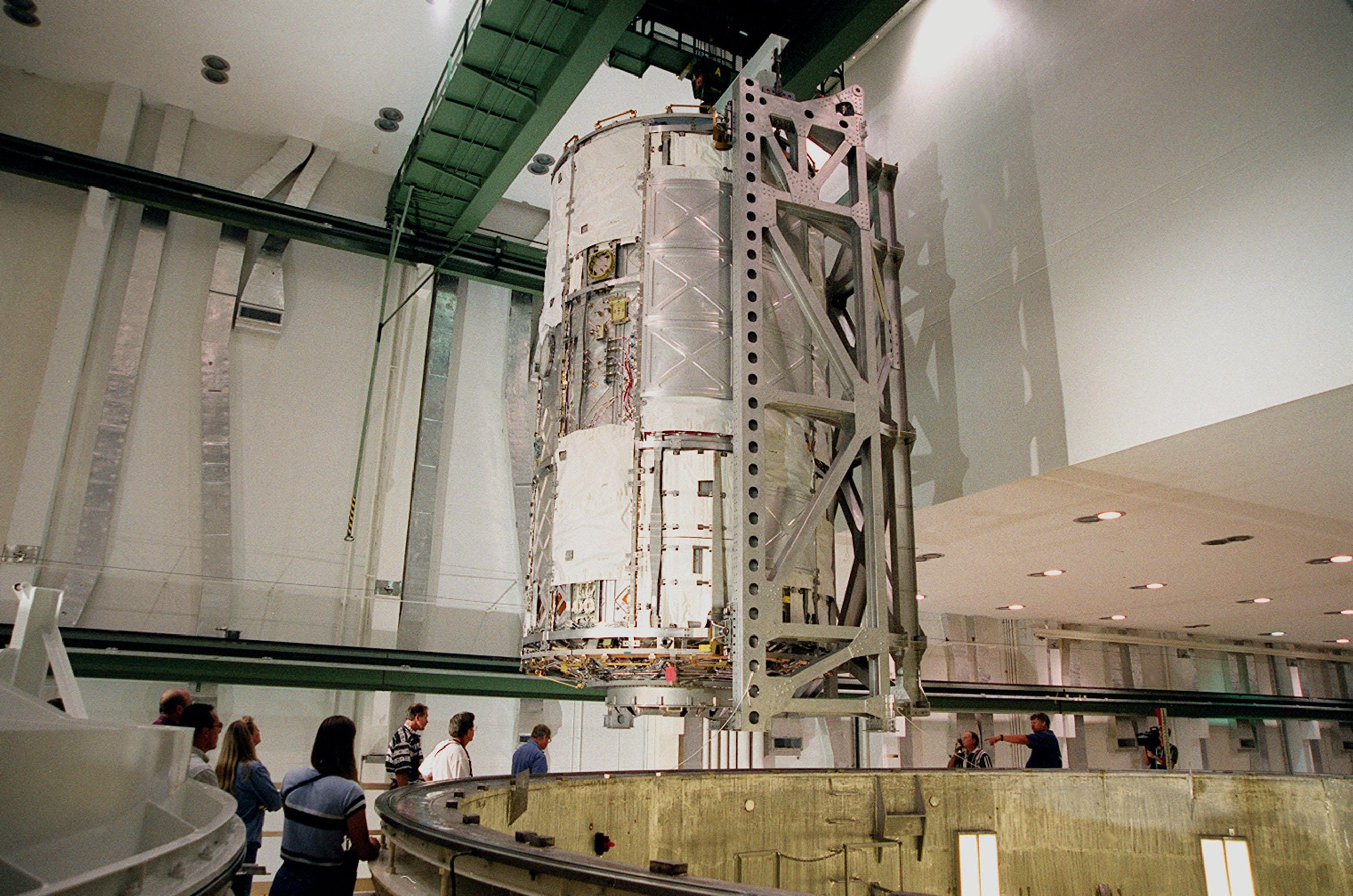
US lab loading into vacuum chamber for testing

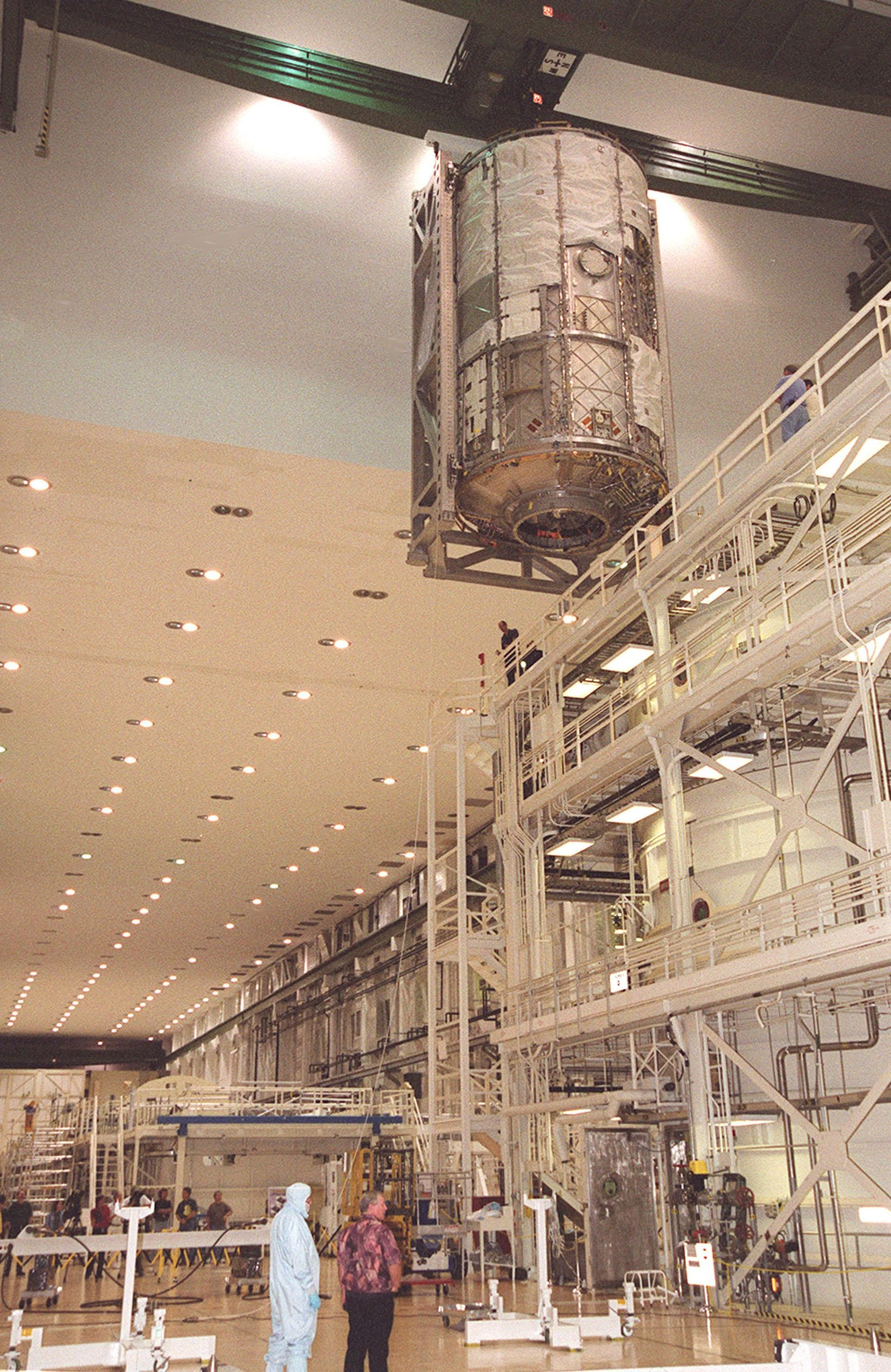
Overhead crane hoisting the US lab

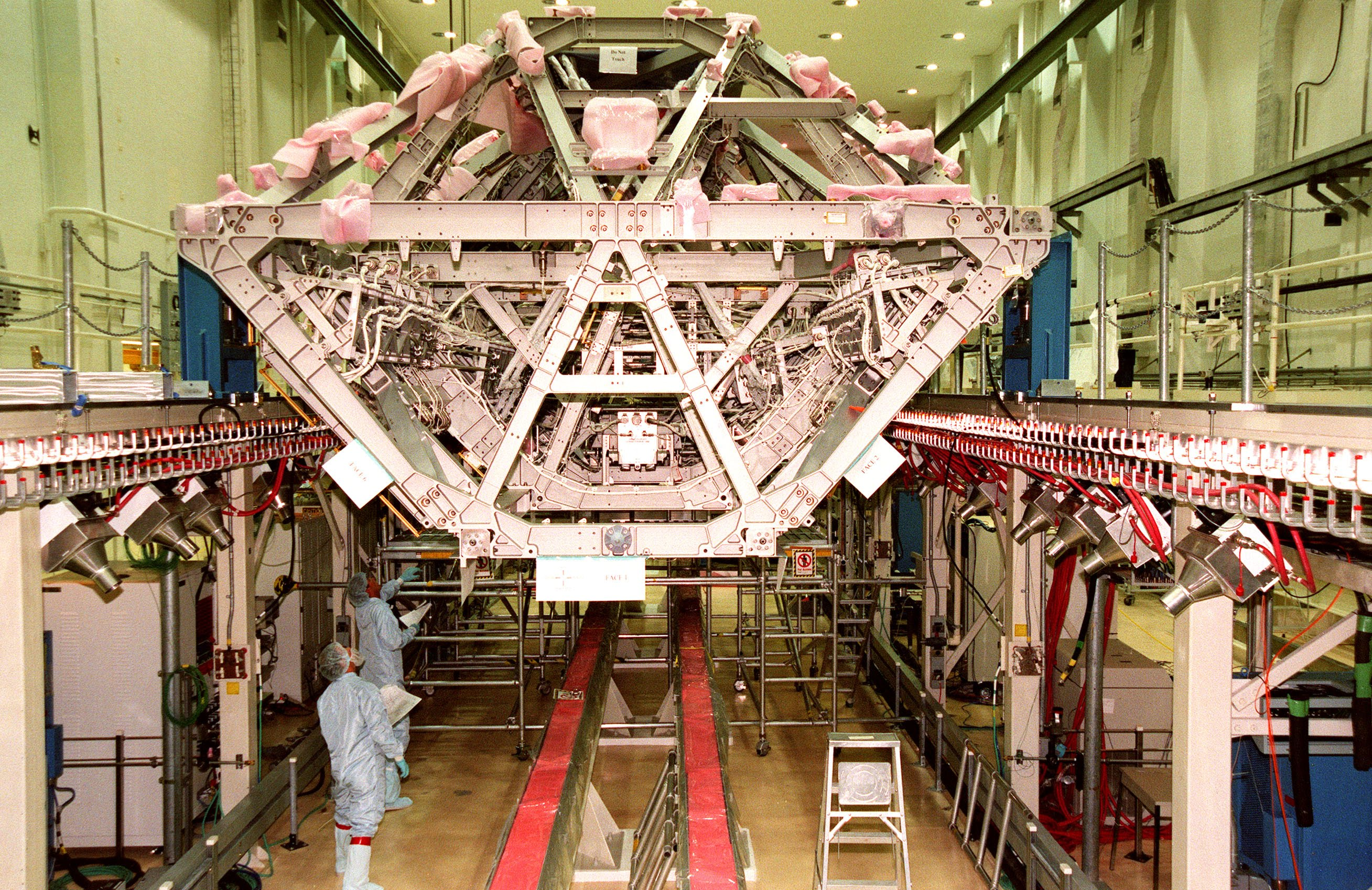
S0 Truss

== See also ==
- Assembly of the International Space Station
- Origins of the International Space Station
- Space architecture
- Aerospace engineering
- Space manufacturing
- Space Station 3D – 2002 Canadian documentary
