= Raffaello MPLM =

Large pressurized container for cargo resupply of the International Space Station

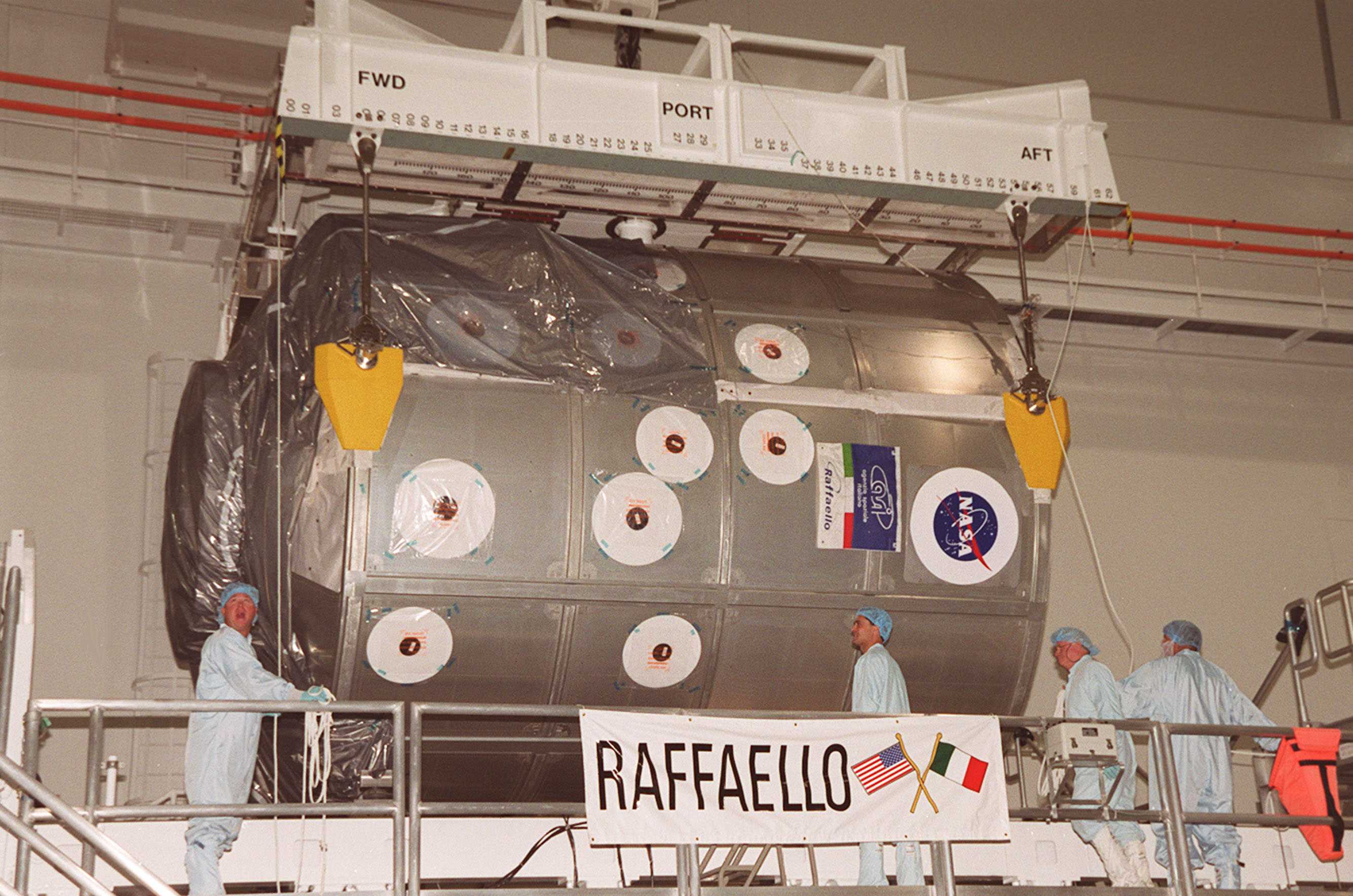
- Raffaello being prepared for flight on STS-100
- Mission type: ISS resupply
- Operator: NASA
- Website: mplm.msfc.nasa.gov
- Mission duration: ~2 weeks

Spacecraft properties
- Spacecraft: MPLM-2 (Raffaello)
- Manufacturer: ASI
- Dry mass: 4,082 kg (8,999 lb)
- Dimensions: 6.4 × 4.6 × 4.6 m (21 × 15 × 15 ft)

Start of mission
- Launch date: 2001–2011
- Rocket: Space Shuttle
- Launch site: Kennedy Space Center, LC-39
- Contractor: NASA

End of mission
- Disposal: Retired

Orbital parameters
- Reference system: Geocentric
- Regime: Low Earth
- Inclination: 51.7°

Berthing at ISS
- Berthing port: Harmony or Unity

Cargo
- Pressurised: ~9,000 kg (20,000 lb)

The Raffaello MPLM, also known as MPLM-2, was one of three Multi-Purpose Logistics Modules which were operated by NASA to transfer supplies and equipment to and from the International Space Station. Raffaello was used for four of twelve MPLM flights to the space station, with Leonardo being used for the remainder. It was first launched on 19 April 2001, aboard the STS-100 mission flown by Space Shuttle Endeavour, and made its third flight in July 2005, aboard Discovery on STS-114. Raffaello's final flight was aboard Space Shuttle Atlantis on the STS-135 mission, the last flight of the Space Shuttle.

In April 2023, Raffaello was transferred to Axiom Space to be repurposed and flown as part of Axiom Station.

== Construction ==
Like the other Multi-Purpose Logistics Modules, Raffaello was constructed by the Italian Space Agency, who chose to name it after the painter and architect Raffaello Sanzio. The module was constructed in the late 1990s, and delivered to NASA at the Kennedy Space Center in August 1999.

== Flights ==
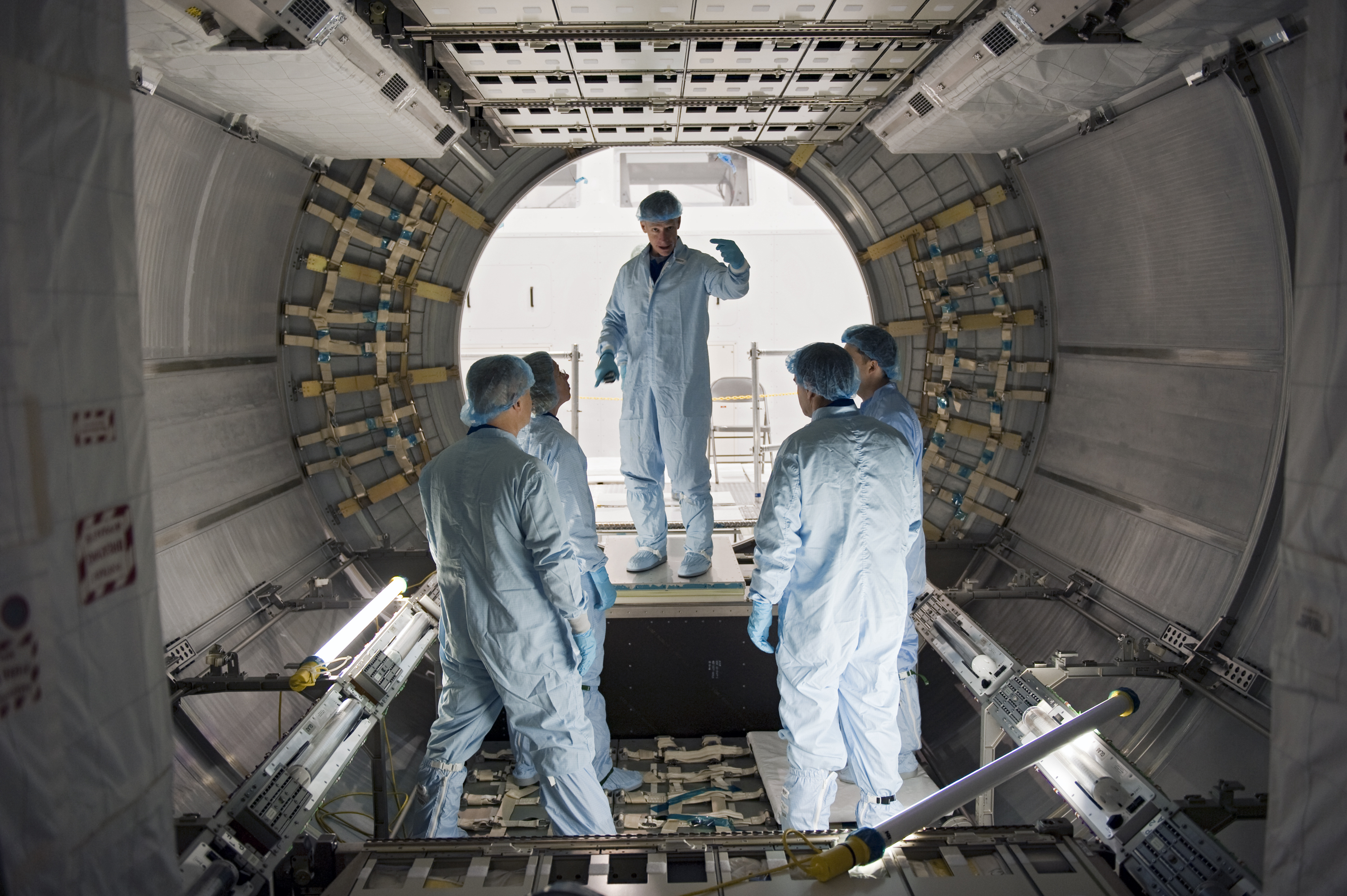
The STS-135 crew inspects Raffaello.

Mission	Orbiter	Launch (UTC)	Landing (UTC)
STS-100	Endeavour	19 April 2001	1 May 2001
STS-108	Endeavour	5 December 2001	17 December 2001
STS-114	Discovery	26 July 2005	9 August 2005
STS-135	Atlantis	8 July 2011	21 July 2011

== See also ==
- Permanent Multipurpose Module
- Leonardo MPLM
