= Standard rack =

Standard rack may refer to:

- 19-inch rack, as used with electrical and electronic equipment
- International Standard Payload Rack, as used in space stations
- A standard gauge rack railway
