= Leonardo (ISS module) =

Italian module of the International Space Station

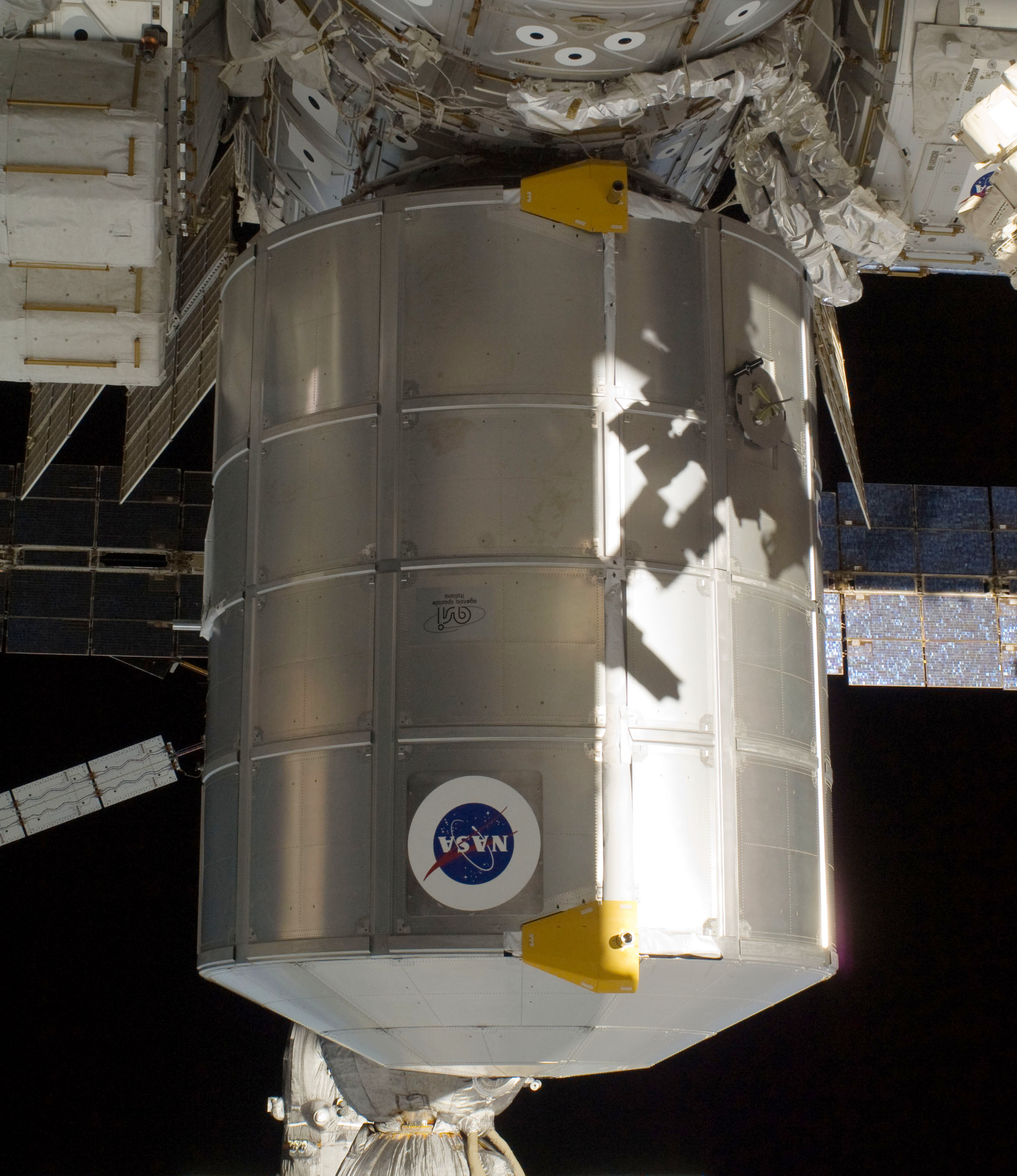
- Leonardo Permanent Multipurpose Module

Module statistics
- Part of: International Space Station
- Launch date: February 24, 2011, 21:53:24 UTC
- Launch vehicle: Space Shuttle Discovery
- Berthed: March 1, 2011-May 27, 2015 (Unity nadir) May 27,2015-present(Tranquility forward)
- Mass: 9,896 kg (21,817 lb)
- Length: 6.6 m (22 ft)
- Diameter: 4.57 m (15.0 ft)
- Pressurized volume: 31 m^{3} (1,100 cu ft)

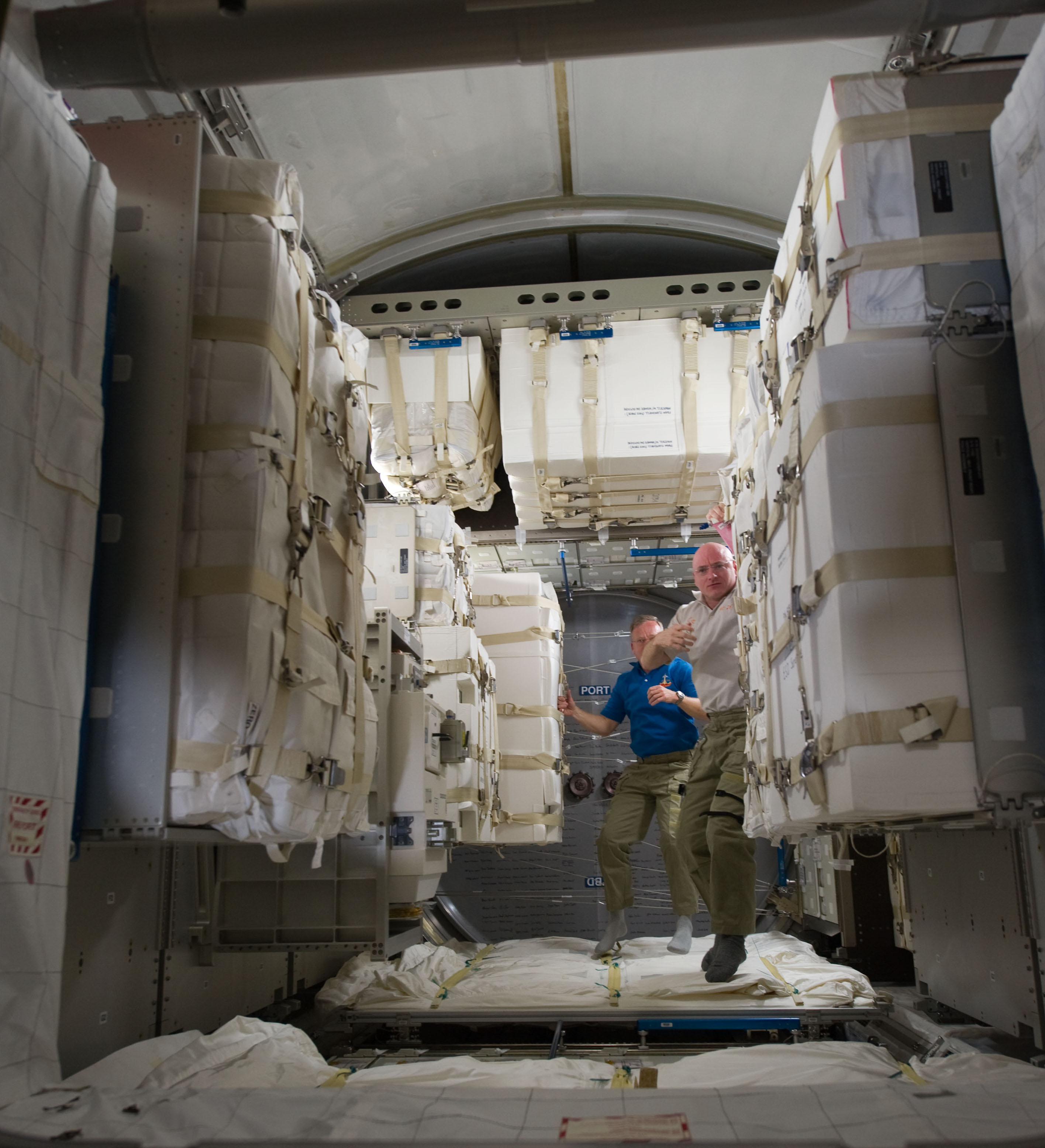
Interior of Leonardo

Leonardo, also known as the Permanent Multipurpose Module (PMM) is a module of the International Space Station. It was flown into space aboard the Space Shuttle Discovery on STS-133 on February 24, 2011, and installed on March 1. Leonardo is primarily used for storage of spares, supplies and waste on the ISS, which was until then stored in many different places within the space station. It is also the personal hygiene area for the astronauts who live in the US Orbital Segment. The Leonardo PMM was a Multi-Purpose Logistics Module (MPLM) before 2011, then was modified into its current configuration. It was formerly one of two MPLM used for bringing cargo to and from the ISS with the Space Shuttle.

Like the other Multi-Purpose Logistics Modules, it was constructed by the Italian Space Agency, who chose to name it after the Italian polymath Leonardo da Vinci. Construction began in April 1996, and the module was delivered to NASA at the Kennedy Space Center in August 1998 by an Airbus Beluga aircraft.

== Previous proposals ==
A European proposal suggested equipping the Donatello MPLM with enhanced micrometeoroid/orbital debris protection and cooling systems, and leaving it attached to the ISS after the Space Shuttle fleet was retired. Costs for such MPLM modifications were estimated at $20M to $40M per unit. The MPLM would then be called a Permanent Multipurpose Module (PMM), and it would house spare parts and supplies, allowing longer times between resupply missions. The proposal was rejected by NASA because it would require changes to existing plans and would entail additional costs. Internal discussions continued and managers considered the possibility of STS-133, which at that time was planned to be the last Shuttle flight, leaving its MPLM permanently attached. The United Launch Alliance also published a proposal for a system that could allow additional ISS modules to be launched on an EELV even after the retirement of the Shuttle.

On August 5, 2009, it was announced that STS-133 would indeed leave one MPLM permanently attached to the station. In October 2009, it was confirmed that Leonardo would be the MPLM converted to a PMM. It was launched on February 24, 2011. The PMM was transferred to the station using the Shuttle robotic arm and mated to the nadir (Earth) facing port of Unity.

On May 27, 2015, at 13:08 UTC, the PMM was relocated from the nadir port of the Unity module to the forward-facing port of the Tranquility module. This was done in order to allow Unity's nadir port to serve as a berthing port for resupply craft, which in turn frees up Harmony's zenith port for future U.S. Commercial Crew Development spacecraft.

After the re-location of Leonardo from the Unity module to the Tranquility module (which is where the toilet is located) in addition to its function as a storage module it is now the personal hygiene area for the ISS astronauts in the US Orbital Segment. Astronauts have much privacy in Leonardo and do sponge baths and change their clothes here.

Raffaello, a MPLM similar to Leonardo, might also be used on Axiom Station after the ISS is decommissioned.

== Modifications ==
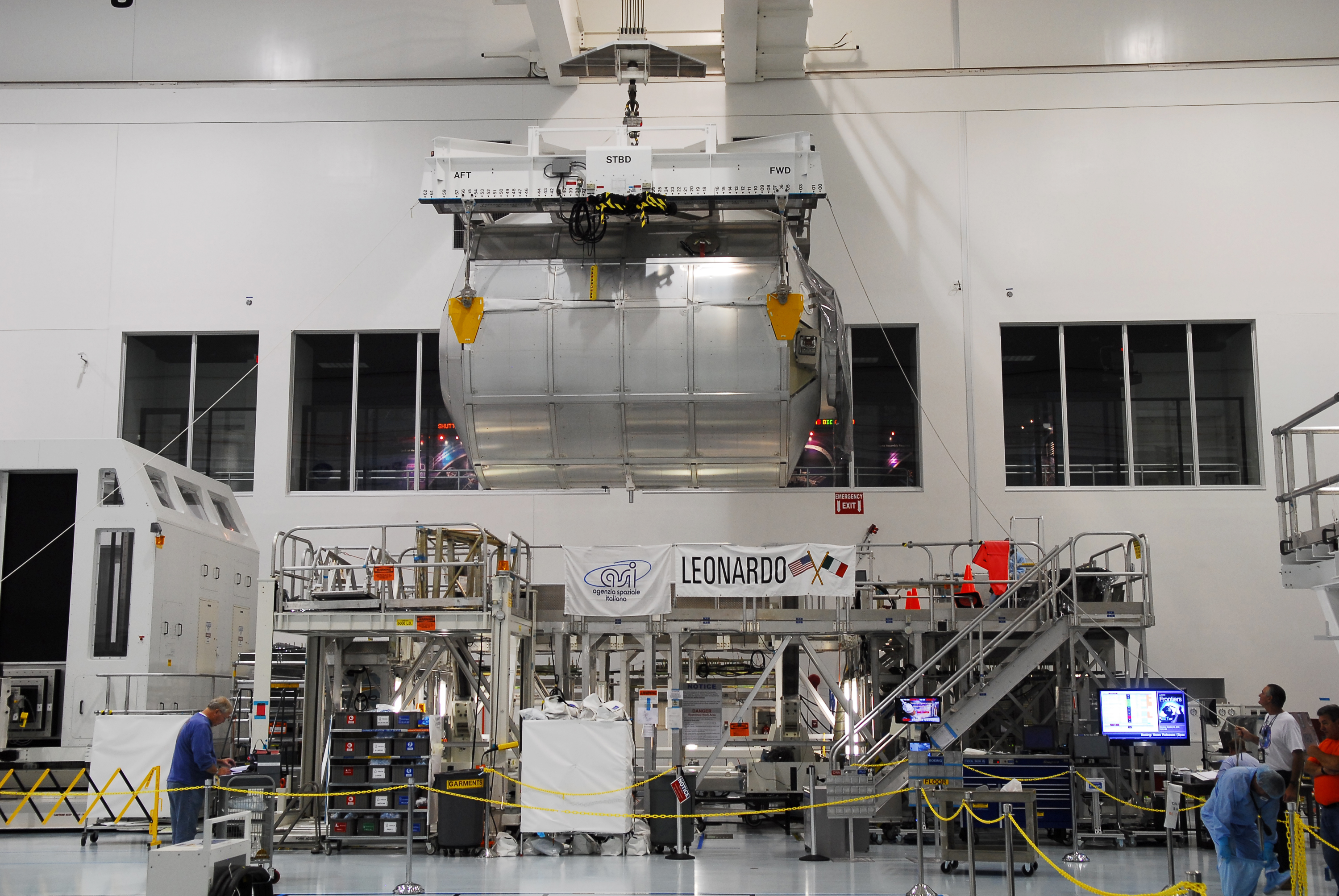
PMM Leonardo at the Space Station Processing Facility (SSPF)

After returning to Earth on April 20, 2010, at the end of the STS-131 mission, the Leonardo MPLM was moved to the Space Station Processing Facility (SSPF) at the Kennedy Space Center in Florida to undergo modifications. To convert the Leonardo MPLM into the PMM, NASA made the following modifications: removal of +Y grapple fixture (Flight Releasable Grapple Fixture, or FRGF), removal of ROFU (Remotely Operated Fluid Umbilical) components, replacement of CBM seal, installation of new forward end cone MMOD shields, feed through seal replacement, and installation of visiting vehicle retro-reflectors.

In addition, the Multi-layer insulation (MLI) blankets from the never-flown Donatello MPLM were cannibalized for use on Leonardo. The blankets were removed and returned to Italy where they were reinforced with Nextel/Kevlar to provide better protection against micro-meteorites. The upgraded blankets were then installed on about two-thirds of Leonardo's surface area.

The Leonardo PMM mass is 21,817 pounds (9,896 kg).

== As an MPLM ==
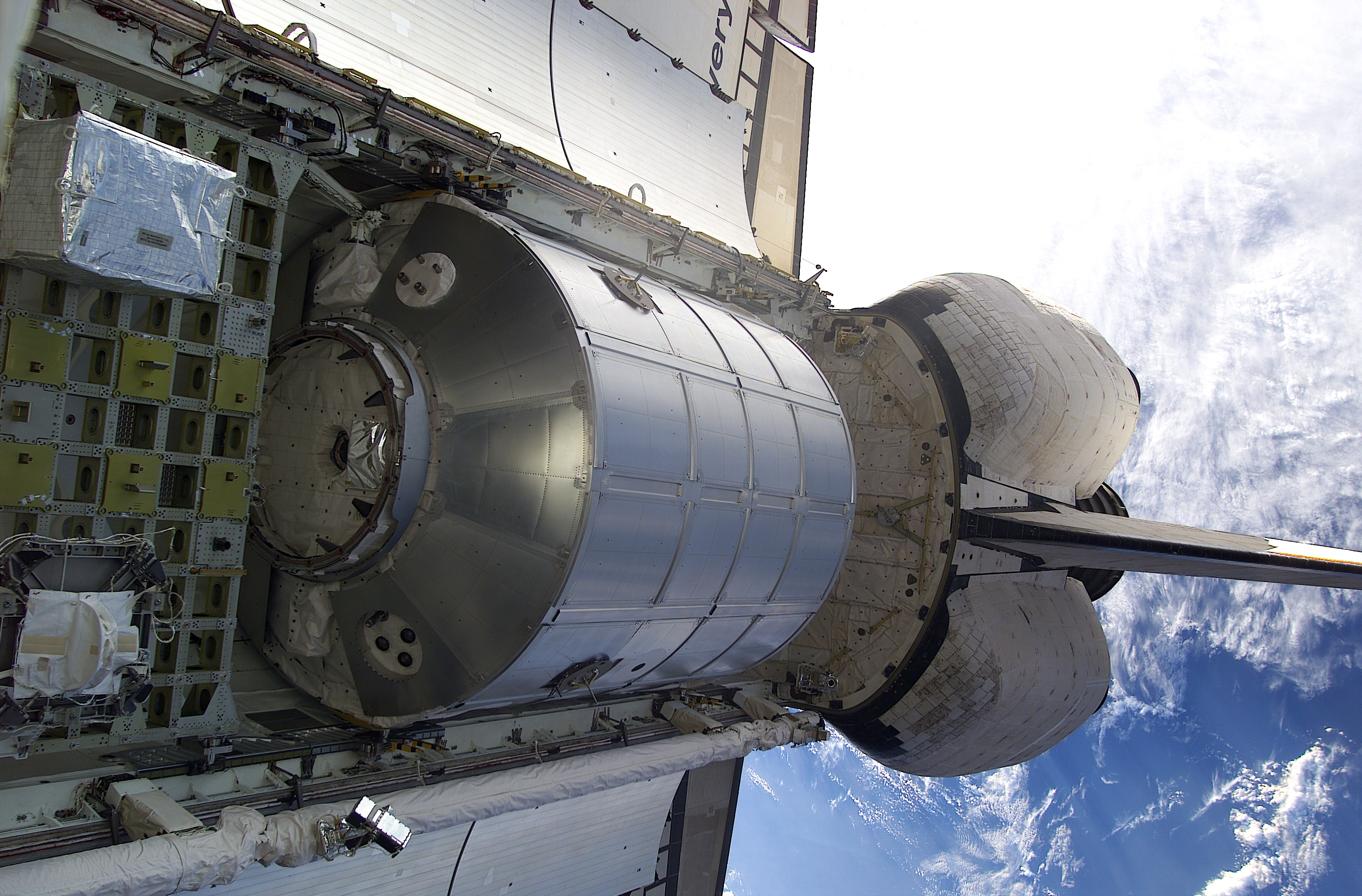
March 10, 2001 – The Leonardo Multi Purpose Logistics Module rests in Discovery's payload bay in this view taken from the ISS by a crew member using a digital still camera during STS-102.

The Leonardo MPLM, also known as MPLM-1, was one of three Multi-Purpose Logistics Modules which were operated by NASA to transfer supplies and equipment to and from the International Space Station. Leonardo was used for eight of the twelve MPLM flights to the space station, with Raffaello being used for the other four. It was the first MPLM to be launched, making its first flight in March 2001, aboard Space Shuttle Discovery on STS-102.

=== Flights ===
Mission	Orbiter	Launch (UTC)	Landing (UTC)	Remarks
STS-102	Discovery	March 8, 2001	March 21, 2001	
STS-105	Discovery	August 10, 2001	August 22, 2001	
STS-111	Endeavour	June 5, 2002	June 19, 2002	
STS-121	Discovery	July 4, 2006	July 17, 2006	
STS-126	Endeavour	November 15, 2008	November 30, 2008	
STS-128	Discovery	August 29, 2009	September 11, 2009	
STS-131	Discovery	April 5, 2010	April 20, 2010	
STS-133	Discovery	February 24, 2011	N/A	Leonardo was left on-station to become the PMM.

== See also ==
- Bigelow Expandable Activity Module (smaller than Leonardo)
- List of International Space Station spacewalks
- List of spacewalks 2000–2014
