= Cygnus NG-13 =

2020 American resupply spaceflight to the ISS

NG-13
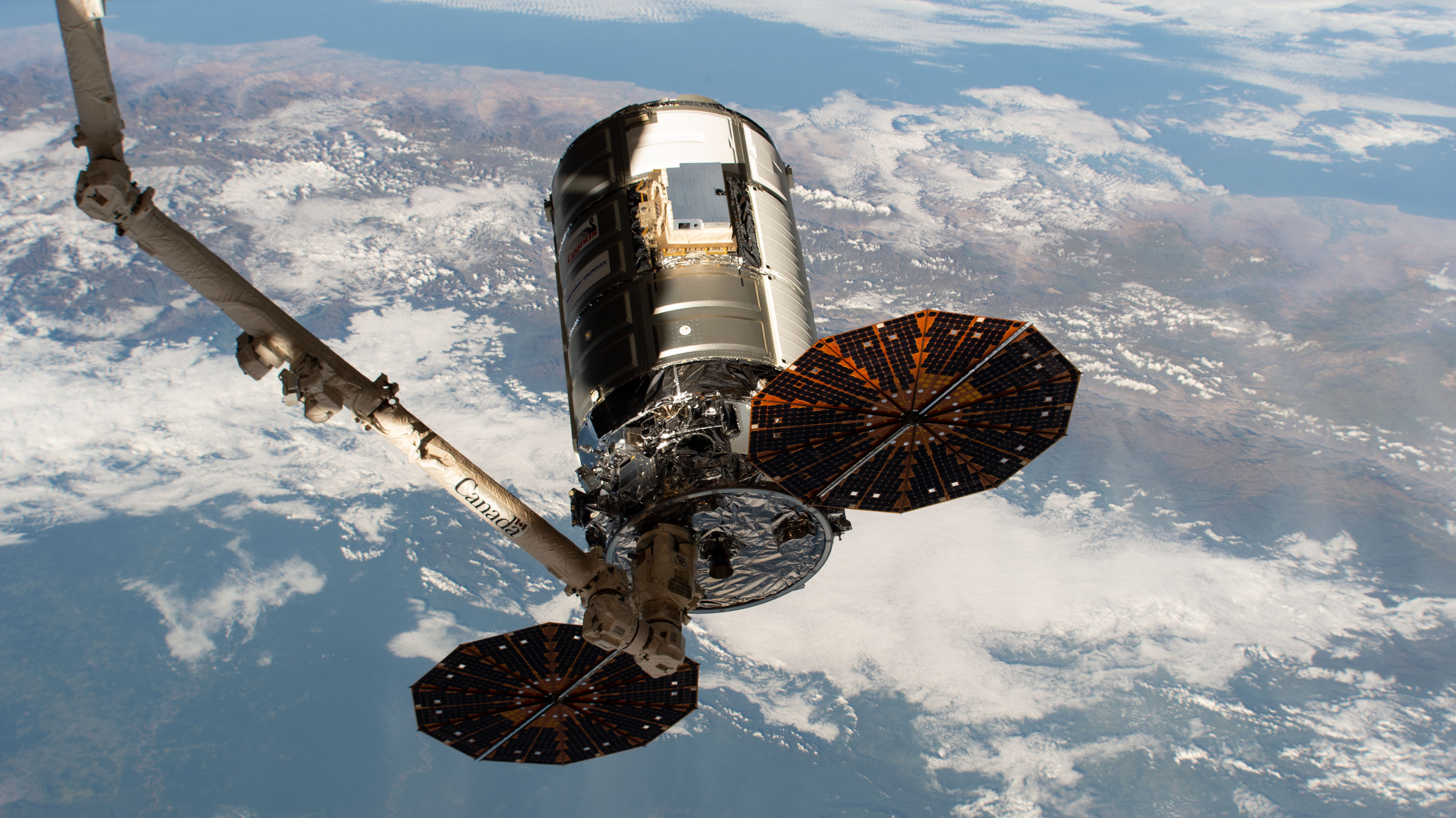
- Canadarm2 grapples the S.S. Robert H. Lawrence
- Names: CRS NG-13; CRS OA-13 (2016–2018)
- Mission type: ISS resupply
- Operator: Northrop Grumman
- COSPAR ID: 2020-011A
- SATCAT no.: 45175
- Mission duration: 103 days, 23 hours, 7 minutes

Spacecraft properties
- Spacecraft: S.S. Robert H. Lawrence
- Spacecraft type: Enhanced Cygnus
- Manufacturer: Northrop Grumman; Thales Alenia Space
- Payload mass: 3,377 kilograms (7,445 lb)

Start of mission
- Launch date: 15 February 2020, 20:21:01 UTC (3:21:01 pm EST)
- Rocket: Antares 230+
- Launch site: MARS, Pad 0A

End of mission
- Disposal: Deorbited
- Decay date: 29 May 2020, 19:29 UTC

Orbital parameters
- Reference system: Geocentric orbit
- Regime: Low Earth orbit
- Inclination: 51.66°

Berthing at ISS
- Berthing port: Unity nadir
- RMS capture: 18 February 2020, 09:05 UTC
- Berthing date: 18 February 2020, 11:16 UTC
- Unberthing date: 11 May 2020, 13:00 UTC
- RMS release: 11 May 2020, 16:09 UTC
- Time berthed: 83 days, 1 hour, 44 minutes
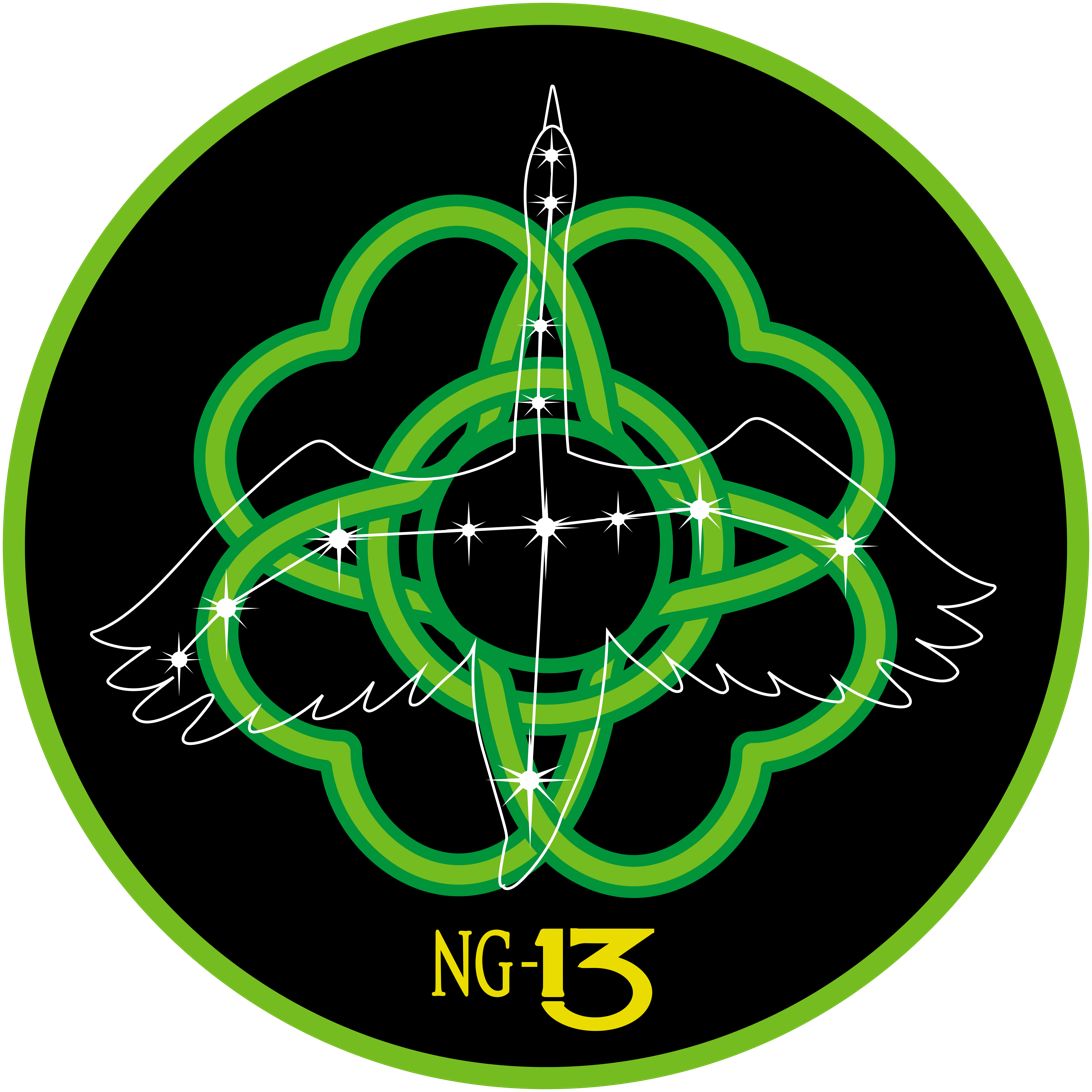
- NASA insignia Commercial Resupply Services Cygnus flights

NG-13, previously known as OA-13, was the fourteenth flight of the Northrop Grumman robotic resupply spacecraft Cygnus and its thirteenth flight to the International Space Station (ISS) under the Commercial Resupply Services (CRS) contract with NASA. The mission launched on 15 February 2020 at 20:21:01 UTC after nearly a week of delays. This is the second launch of Cygnus under the CRS-2 contract.

Orbital ATK and NASA jointly developed a new space transportation system to provide commercial cargo resupply services to the International Space Station (ISS). Under the Commercial Orbital Transportation Services (COTS) program, then Orbital Sciences designed and built Antares, a medium-class launch vehicle, with Ukrainian specialists providing first stage structure, and Russian specialists providing first stage engines.

Cygnus, an advanced maneuvered spacecraft, mates a Pressurized Cargo Module, provided by Orbital's industrial partner Thales Alenia Space, with their GEOStar satellite bus. Northrop Grumman purchased Orbital in June 2018; its ATK division was renamed Northrop Grumman Innovation Systems.

== History ==
Cygnus NG-13 is the second Cygnus mission under Commercial Resupply Services-2.

Production and integration of Cygnus spacecraft are performed in Dulles, Virginia. The Cygnus service module is mated with the pressurized cargo module at the launch site, and mission operations are conducted from control centers in Dulles, Virginia and Houston, Texas.

The original launch attempt on 9 February 2020 was scheduled to launch at 22:39:30 UTC before being pushed to the end of its five-minute window at 22:44:29 UTC, only to end up being scrubbed due to a technical issue with a regulator at the launch pad with three minutes left in the countdown. The second launch attempt on 14 February 2020 at 20:43:34 UTC was scrubbed due to strong upper winds with less than ninety minutes left in the countdown. Cygnus NG-13 was launched successfully on 15 February 2020 at 20:21:01 UTC.

== Launch and early operations ==
After Northrop Grumman purchased Orbital ATK in June 2018, the mission was changed from OA-13 to NG-13. The Antares rocket was built and processed in the Horizontal Integration Facility over the course of six months. The rocket was rolled out to MARS Pad 0A where it was originally planned to launch 9 February 2020 but was scrubbed and delayed due to inclement weather and an issue with a regulator at the launch pad. The mission launched successfully on the 15 February 2020 at 20:21:01 UTC with no delay and no apparent problems. The Cygnus spacecraft arrived at the space station on 18 February 2020 at 09:05 UTC. Expedition 62 astronaut Andrew Morgan grappled the spacecraft using the station's robotic arm. After Cygnus capture, ground controllers commanded the station's arm to rotate and install Cygnus on the Earth-facing port of the station's Unity module at 11:16 UTC. The Cygnus spacecraft remained at the space station until 11 May 2020. The Saffire-IV experiment was conducted within Cygnus after it departs the station, and prior to deorbit, when it disposed of several tons of trash during reentry into Earth's atmosphere, over the Pacific Ocean, on 29 May 2020.

=== Launch attempt summary ===
Note: Times are local to the launch site (Eastern Daylight Time).

Attempt	Planned	Result	Turnaround	Reason	Decision point	Weather go (%)	Notes
1	9 Feb 2020, 5:44:29 pm	Scrubbed	—	Technical	9 Feb 2020, 5:41 pm	100	Scrubbed due to off-nominal data from ground support.
2	13 Feb 2020, 4:06:03 pm	Scrubbed	3 days 22 hours 22 minutes	Weather	11 Feb 2020, 11:50 am	45	Concerns over bad weather.
3	14 Feb 2020, 3:43:34 pm	Scrubbed	0 days 23 hours 38 minutes	Weather	14 Feb 2020, 2:07 pm	90	Concerns over high speed upper-level winds.
4	15 Feb 2020, 3:21:01 pm	Success	0 days 23 hours 37 minutes			85	

== Spacecraft ==
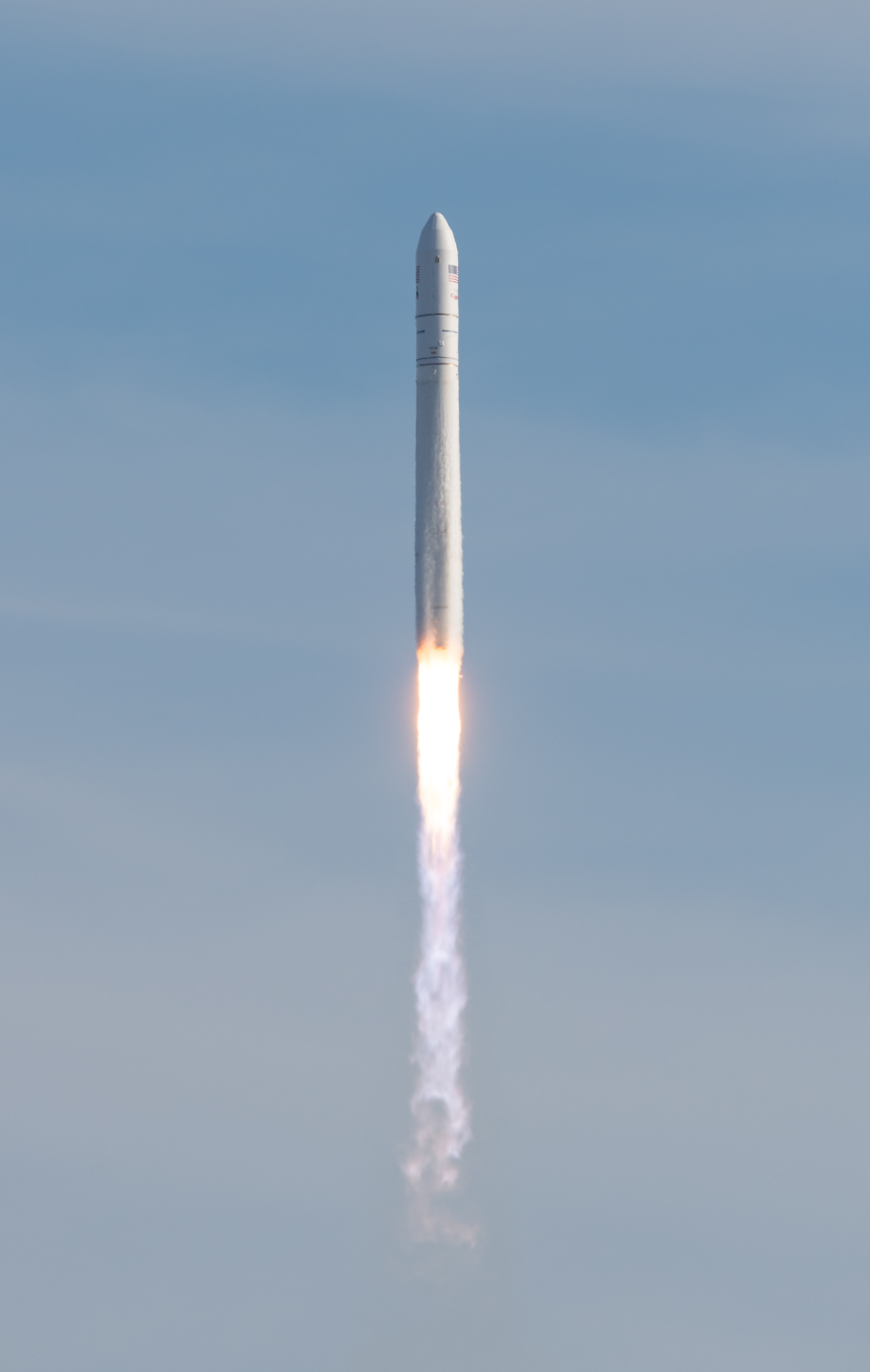
Antares 230+ launches the Cygnus NG-13 mission.

This was the tenth flight of the Enhanced-sized Cygnus PCM. This Cygnus spacecraft was named to honor Robert H. Lawrence.

== Manifest ==
The Cygnus spacecraft was loaded with 3,377 kilograms (7,445 lb) of pressurized cargo with packaging, broken down as follows:

- Vehicle hardware: 1,588 kg (3,501 lb)
- Science investigations: 966 kg (2,129 lb)
- Crew supplies: 712 kg (1,570 lb)
- Spacewalk equipment: 81 kg (179 lb)
- Computer resources: 30 kg (66 lb)

== Hardware ==
NASA provided the following breakdown of the cargo's hardware for ISS:

- Columbus Ka-band Terminal (COLKa) Assembly: module enhancement hardware to upgrade the communications capability in Columbus science module
- Major Constituents Analyzer (MCA) Mass Spectrometer: critical spare to support laboratories and connecting module operations of the MCAs to detect atmospheric constituents on board the space station
- External High Definition Camera (EHDC) Assembly: major camera assembly spare that will replace a failed camera on-orbit during a spring 2020 EVA
- Water Stowage System (WSS) Resupply Tanks (RST): nine water tanks to support crew and hardware requirements during the 2020 timeframe
- Nitrogen/Oxygen Recharge System (NORS) Tanks: two recharge tanks to replenish on-orbit oxygen to be utilized in upcoming spacewalks, and one air tank to support the Commercial Crew Vehicle (CCV) Emergency Breathing Air Assembly (CEBAA) hardware launching in 2020
- POLAR Flight Assembly: cold stowage capability to support payload transportation to the ISS

== Research ==
The new experiments arriving at the orbiting laboratory challenged and inspired future scientists and explorers and provided valuable insight for researchers. These experiments test new facilities for microscopic viewing and cell culturing, and particle identification will seek to better understand how fire spreads in microgravity and studied how bacteriophages behave in space. The Saffire-IV experiment occurred after Cygnus left the ISS.

- Mobile SpaceLab, a tissue and cell culturing facility that offers investigators a quick-turnaround platform to perform sophisticated microgravity biology experiments. This will be mounted in a designated EXPRESS rack on ISS
- Mochii, initial demonstration of a new miniature scanning electron microscope (SEM) with spectroscopy
- Spacecraft Fire Experiment-IV (Saffire-IV), fourth in a series of experiments on fire and combustibles
- OsteoOmics examines osteoblast cells at a molecular level to better understand bone loss
- Phage Evolution studies the effects of microgravity and radiation exposure on bacteriophages and their hosts

== Cubesats ==
Cubesats planned for release: Red-Eye 2, DeMI, TechEdSat 10. A CubeSat payload for the communications provider Lynk (2020-011D) was ejected from the Slingshot deployer on Cygnus on 13 May 2020 at 23:25 UTC. Another payload (another Lynk, or perhaps WIDAR) remained attached to Cygnus and deployed a communications antenna. The payloads were launched aboard SpaceX CRS-20 and installed on the Cygnus hatch by the ISS crew. The Cygnus host a NASA combustion experiment inside its pressurized cabin before Northrop Grumman controllers command the spacecraft to a destructive re-entry over the South Pacific Ocean on 29 May 2020.

== Disposal ==
On 26 May, after unberthing from the ISS and before disposal, the experiment in rocket exhaust driven amplification (REDA) of very low frequency (VLF) radiowaves was conducted. The BT-4 engine on Cygnus was fired for 60 seconds, while coherent 25.2 kHz VLF radiowaves were transmitted through the rocket exhaust plume from the U.S. Navy NML Transmitter in LaMoure, North Dakota. Radiowaves were then received by Radio Receiver Instrument (RRI) on the e-POP payload of Canadian CASSIOPE satellite at higher orbit. Amplification by 30 decibels was observed.

Cygnus NG-13 was another test of the Cygnus External Payload Carrier. Europe's HDEV experiment which has provided high definition views of the Earth was disposed on Cygnus NG-13.

== See also ==
- Uncrewed spaceflights to the International Space Station
