= Harmony (ISS module) =

American module of the International Space Station

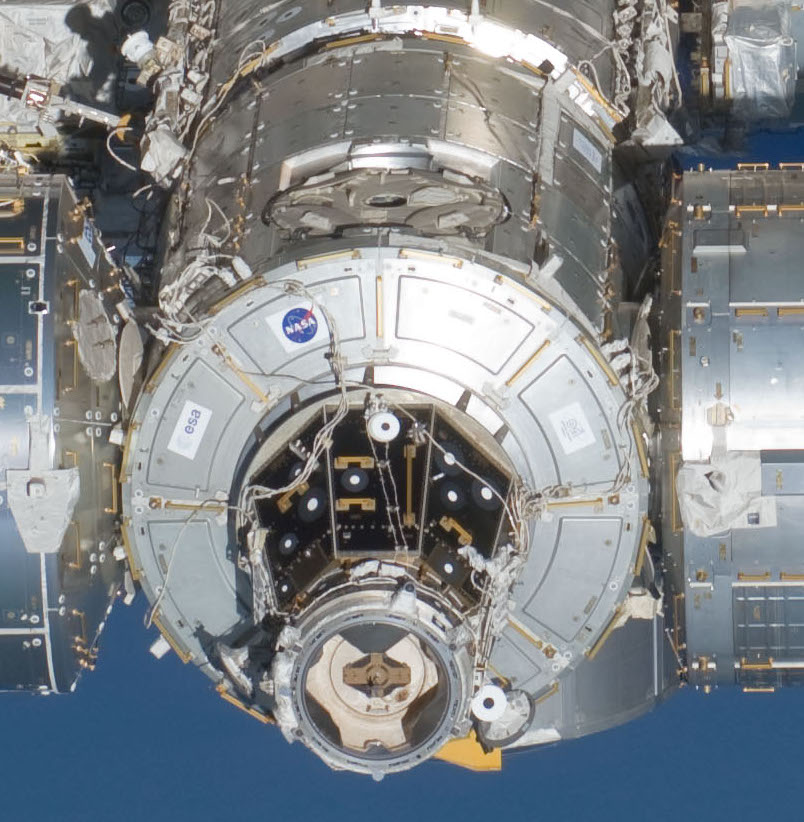
- Harmony shown connected to Columbus, Kibō, and Destiny. PMA-2 faces towards the camera. The nadir and zenith locations are open.

Module statistics
- Part of: International Space Station
- Launch date: October 23, 2007, 15:38:19 UTC
- Launch vehicle: Space Shuttle Discovery
- Berthed: October 26–November 12, 2007: Unity port; November 14, 2007–present: Destiny forward
- Mass: 14,300 kg (31,500 lb)
- Length: 6.7 m (22 ft)
- Diameter: 4.4 m (14 ft)
- Pressurized volume: 70 m^{3} (2,500 cu ft)

Configuration
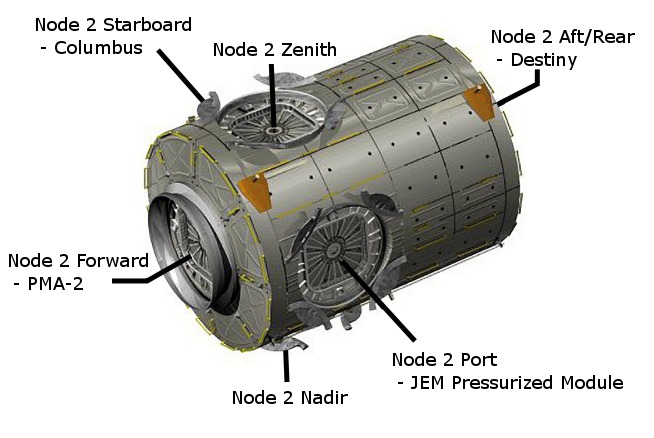
- Graphic showing the six CBMs on Harmony

Harmony, also known as Node 2, is a module of the International Space Station (ISS) that serves as its "utility hub". It connects the laboratory modules of the United States, Europe and Japan, while also providing electrical power and data. The module also has sleeping cabins for four astronauts.

Harmony has six Common Berthing Mechanism (CBM) ports. It is attached to Destiny at its aft port, with Columbus to starboard and Kibō to port. Its forward and zenith ports are each equipped with a Pressurized Mating Adapter (PMA) and International Docking Adapter (IDA) for docking visiting spacecraft. The nadir CBM, the only one without permanently mounted equipment, is typically used for berthing cargo spacecraft.

Harmony was launched aboard STS-120 on October 23, 2007. It was first attached temporarily to the port side of the Unity module before being moved to its permanent location on the forward end of Destiny on November 14, 2007. The module added 70 m^{3} (2,500 cu ft) of habitable volume to the station, increasing its living space by nearly 20%, from 420 to 490 m^{3} (15,000 to 17,000 cu ft).

== Origin of name ==
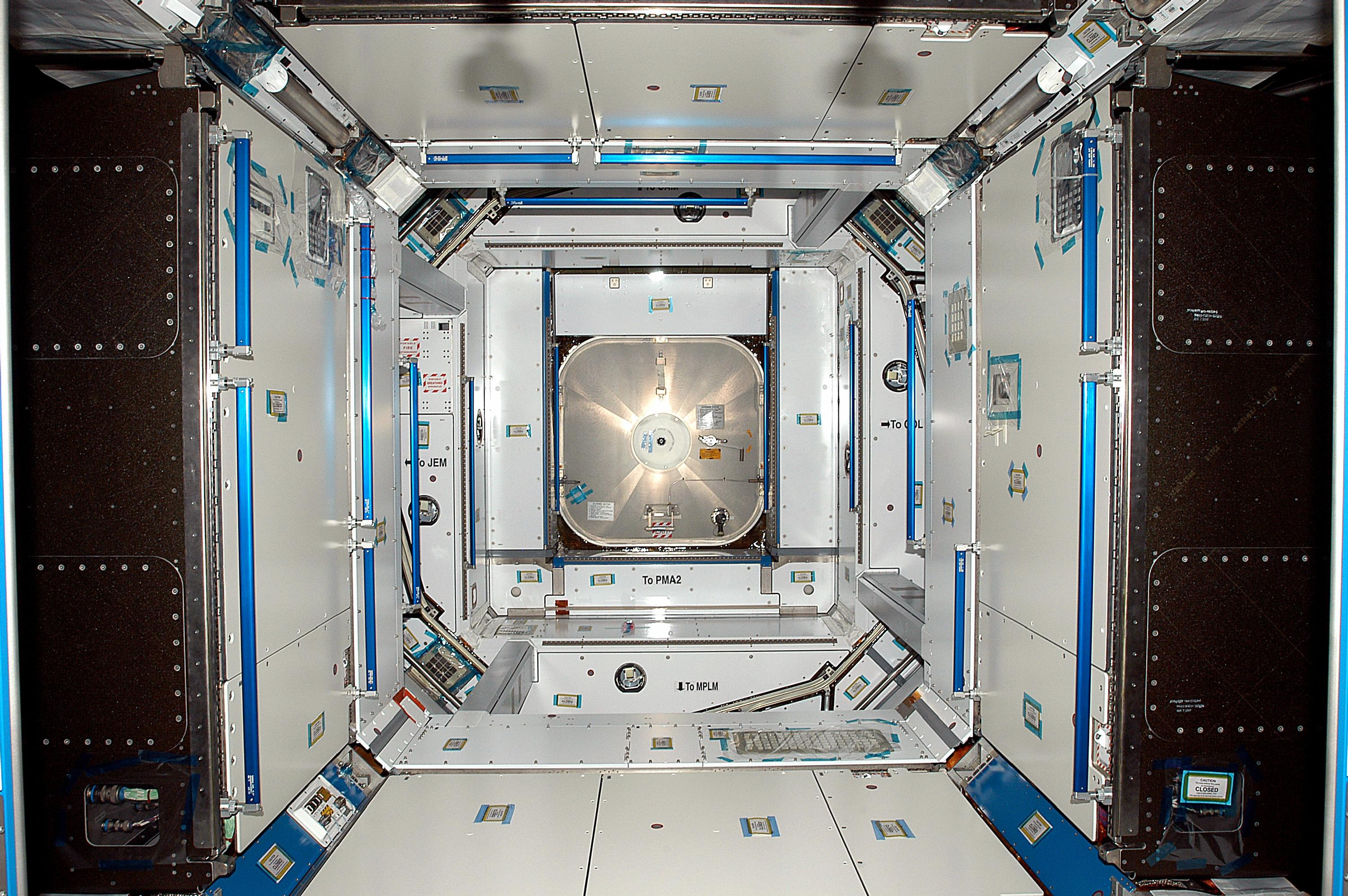
Interior of Harmony

The unit formerly known as Node 2 was renamed Harmony in March 2004. The name was chosen in a competition where more than 2,200 students from 32 states participated. The Node 2 Challenge required students to learn about the space station, build a scale model, and write an essay explaining their proposed name for the module, which will serve as a central hub for science labs. The six winning classes were: Paul Cummins' 8th grade class at Browne Academy, Alexandria, Va.; Mrs.Sue Wilson's 3rd grade class at Buchanan Elementary School, Baton Rouge, La.; Brigette Berry's 8th grade class at League City Intermediate School, League City, Texas; Bradley Neu's 9th grade science class at Lubbock High School, Lubbock, Texas; Russell Yocum 's 3rd grade class at West Navarre Intermediate School, Navarre, Fla.; and, David Dexheimer's students at the World Group Home School, Monona, Wisconsin.

== Specifications ==
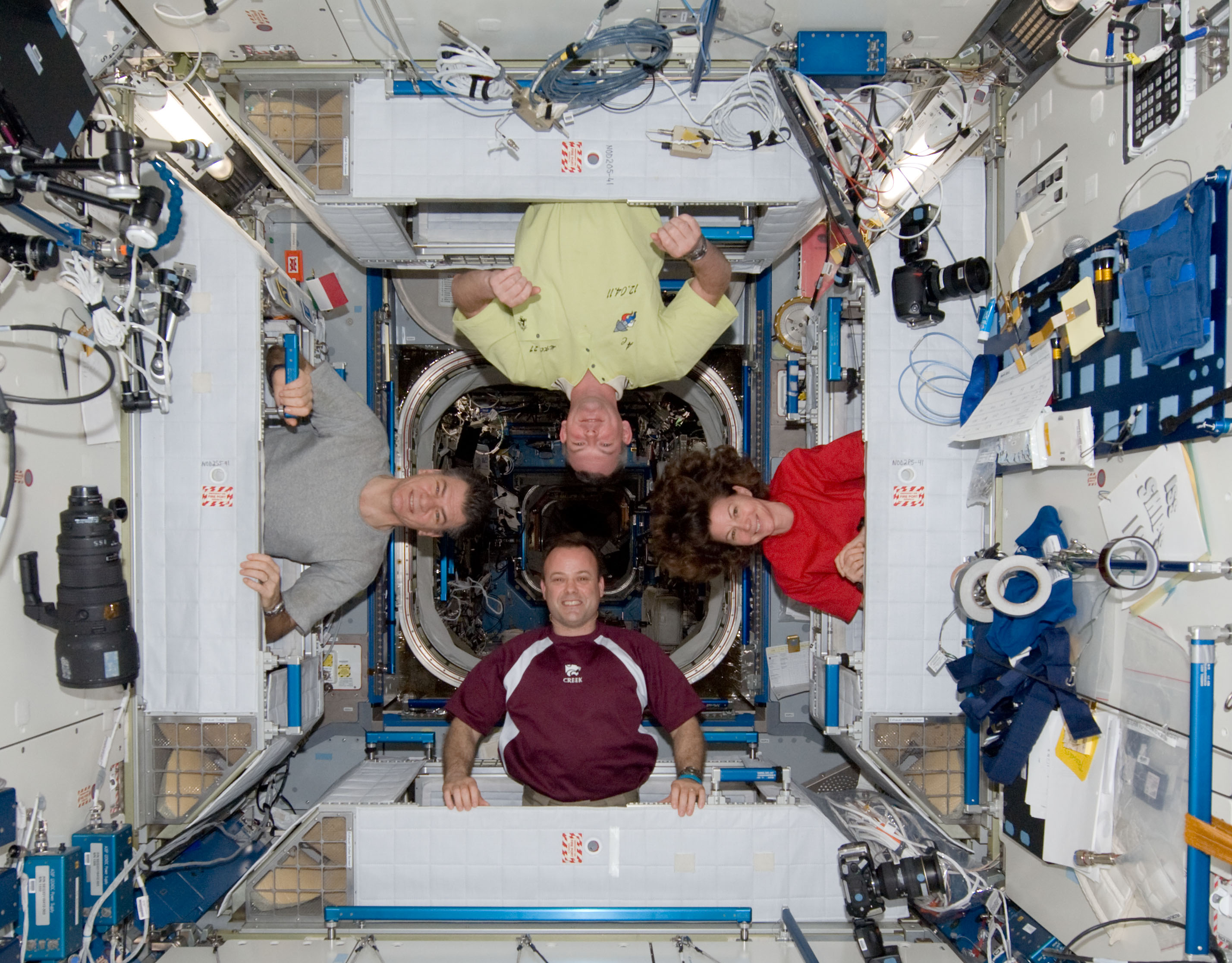
Crew members hanging out of the USOS crew quarters

Harmony is the second of three node modules on the United States Orbital Segment (USOS). It is composed of a cylindrical, 5.1 cm (2.0 in) thick 2219-T851 aluminium alloy pressure shell with two endcones and is thermally insulated by a goldised Kapton blanket. It is protected from micrometeoroids by 98 panels, each made from a composite sandwich of stainless steel and 6061-T6 aluminium alloy, and a secondary barrier of Kevlar/resin. The design is based on the existing Multi-Purpose Logistics Module, as well as the European Space Agency's Columbus module (both of which have only one passive Common Berthing Mechanism [CBM]). There are six CBMs on Harmony: the aft CBM that connects it to Destiny is passive; the rest are active.

Harmony is managed by NASA's Marshall Space Flight Center in Huntsville, Alabama. Its deployment expanded the Space Station, allowing it to grow from the size of a three-bedroom house, to the space equivalent of a typical five-bedroom house, once the Japanese Kibō and European Columbus laboratories are attached. The Space Station robotic arm, Canadarm2, is able to operate from a powered grapple fixture on the exterior of Harmony. Harmony is equipped with eight International Standard Payload Racks: four avionics racks and four for stowage or crew quarters. The first two were delivered on STS-126 and the second two on STS-128. After the cancellation of the Habitation Module, Harmony was chosen to house the American Crew Quarters.

== Construction agreement ==
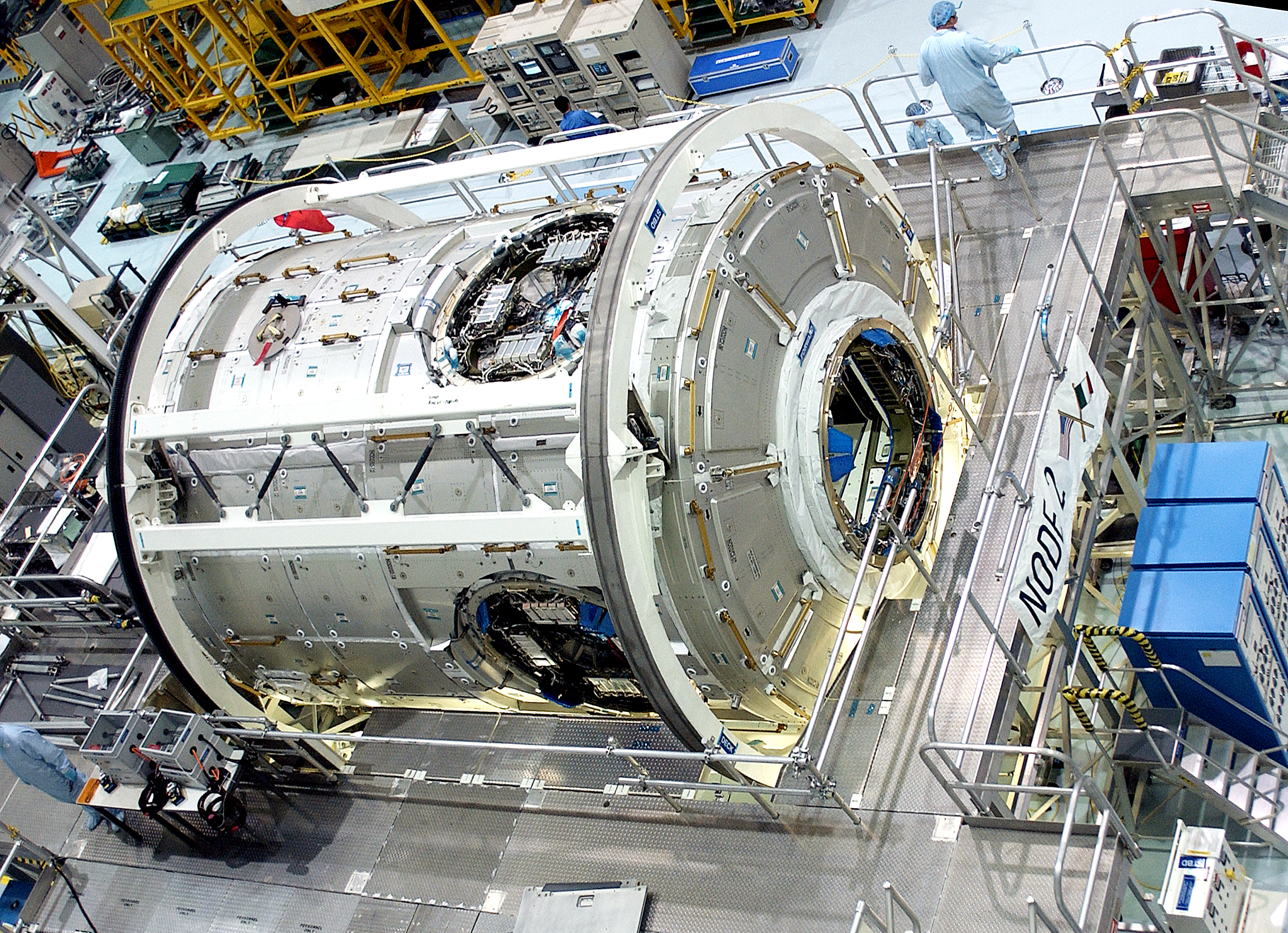
Harmony during assembly at the Space Station Processing Facility

Harmony was built within the ESA–NASA ISS bartering system. Under this arrangement, the European Space Agency (ESA) agreed to provide NASA with the fully integrated Harmony and Tranquility node modules, along with additional equipment and parts, in exchange for the launch of ESA's Columbus module and its initial payload aboard the Space Shuttle. This barter allowed ESA to secure launch services without a direct financial transaction, and enabling those funds to remain within ESA member states.

To build the nodes, ESA partnered with the Italian Space Agency (ASI) and Thales Alenia Space, which manufactured them at its facility in Turin, Italy.

Harmony arrived at Kennedy Space Center in Florida on June 1, 2003, after being transported aboard an Airbus Beluga oversize cargo aircraft. Following a post-transportation inspection, the ASI formally handed over Harmony to the ESA. ESA then transferred ownership to NASA on June 18, 2003, during a ceremony at the Space Station Processing Facility at Kennedy Space Center.

== Launch and installation ==
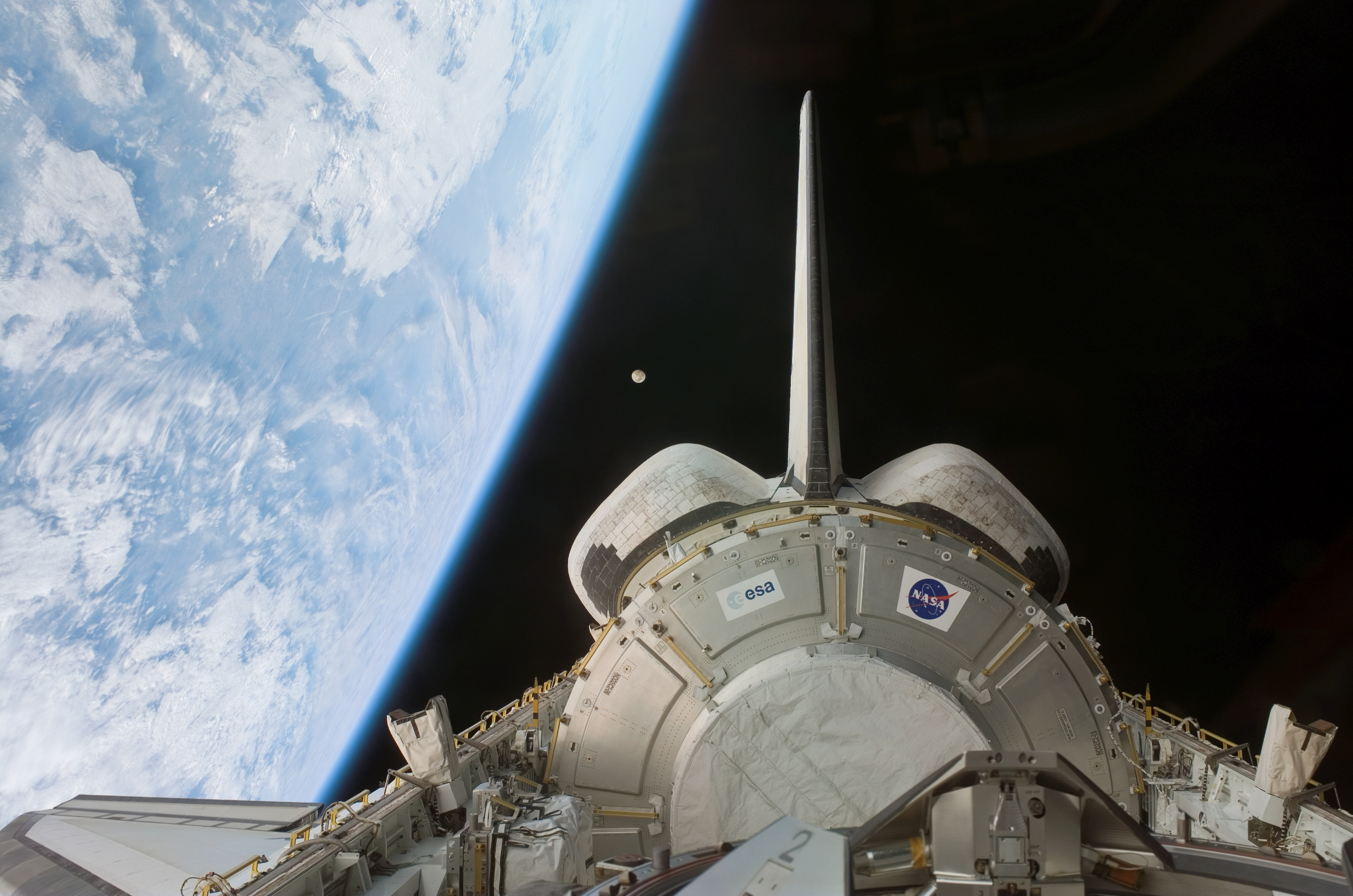
Harmony inside the payload bay of Space Shuttle Discovery while on its way to the ISS.

Harmony was launched on October 23, 2007, aboard Space Shuttle Discovery during mission STS-120, as the primary component of assembly mission ISS-10A. Discovery docked at Pressurized Mating Adapter-2 (PMA-2) on the forward port of the Destiny laboratory module on October 25. The next day, the station's Canadarm2 removed Harmony from Discovery's cargo bay and temporarily attached it to the port side of the Unity node. On October 27, the crew entered Harmony for the first time.

After the shuttle's departure, the Expedition 16 crew used the Canadarm2 to relocate PMA-2 from Destiny's forward port to Harmony's forward port on November 12. Two days later, on November 14, Harmony, with PMA-2 attached, was berthed at its final position on the forward port of Destiny. This process spanned several days and required three spacewalks.

== Connecting modules and visiting vehicles ==
After Harmony's final installation, all subsequent Space Shuttle missions docked at PMA-2 on its forward port. Since the Shuttle's retirement, this port has remained the primary docking location for visiting Dragon and Starliner spacecraft.

On February 11, 2008, ESA's Columbus laboratory module was attached to Harmony's starboard port during the STS-122 mission flown by Space Shuttle Atlantis.

On March 14, 2008, the Experiment Logistics Module Pressurized Section (ELM-PS), part of the future Kibō laboratory module, was temporarily attached to Harmony's zenith (space-facing) port during mission STS-123 aboard Space Shuttle Endeavour.

On June 3, 2008, the Kibō laboratory module was installed on Harmony's port side during mission STS-124 aboard Discovery. Three days later, on June 6, the ELM-PS was relocated from Harmony's zenith port to its permanent position on Kibō's zenith port.

When the Shuttle delivered Multi-Purpose Logistics Modules, they were temporarily berthed to Harmony's nadir (Earth-facing) port. The same port has also been used for cargo spacecraft including the Japanese HTV and American Dragon and Cygnus.

Harmony's zenith port was originally intended for the Centrifuge Accommodations Module, which was later canceled. On January 25, 2010, PMA-3 was moved from Unity's port berthing mechanism to Harmony's zenith mechanism for temporary storage during the installation of the Tranquility node module on mission STS-130. On February 16, 2010, PMA-3 was relocated to Tranquility's port side. It was ultimately returned to Harmony's zenith port on March 26, 2017, where it now serves as a secondary docking port for visiting Dragon and Starliner spacecraft.

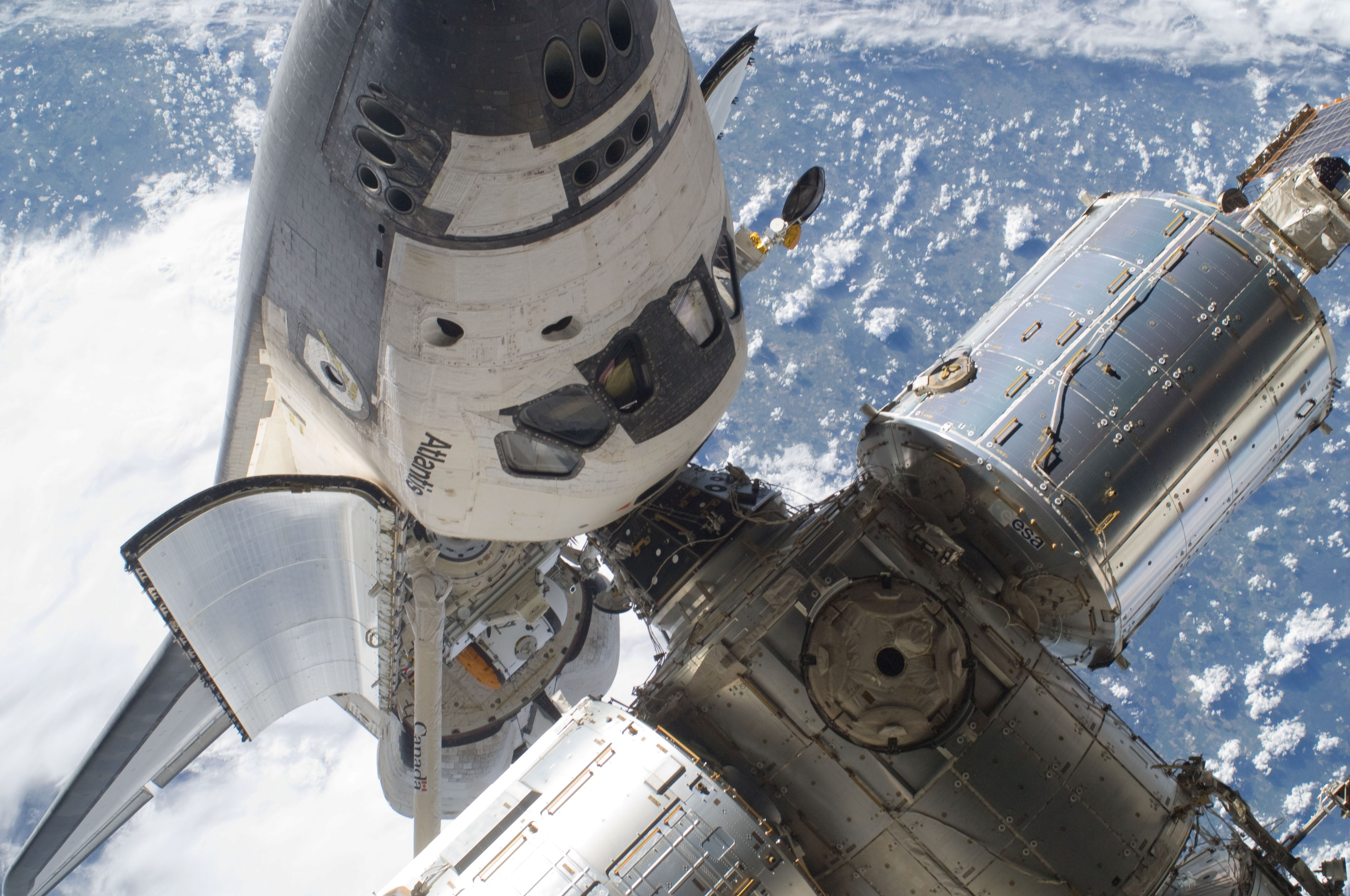
Space Shuttle docked to Harmony forward

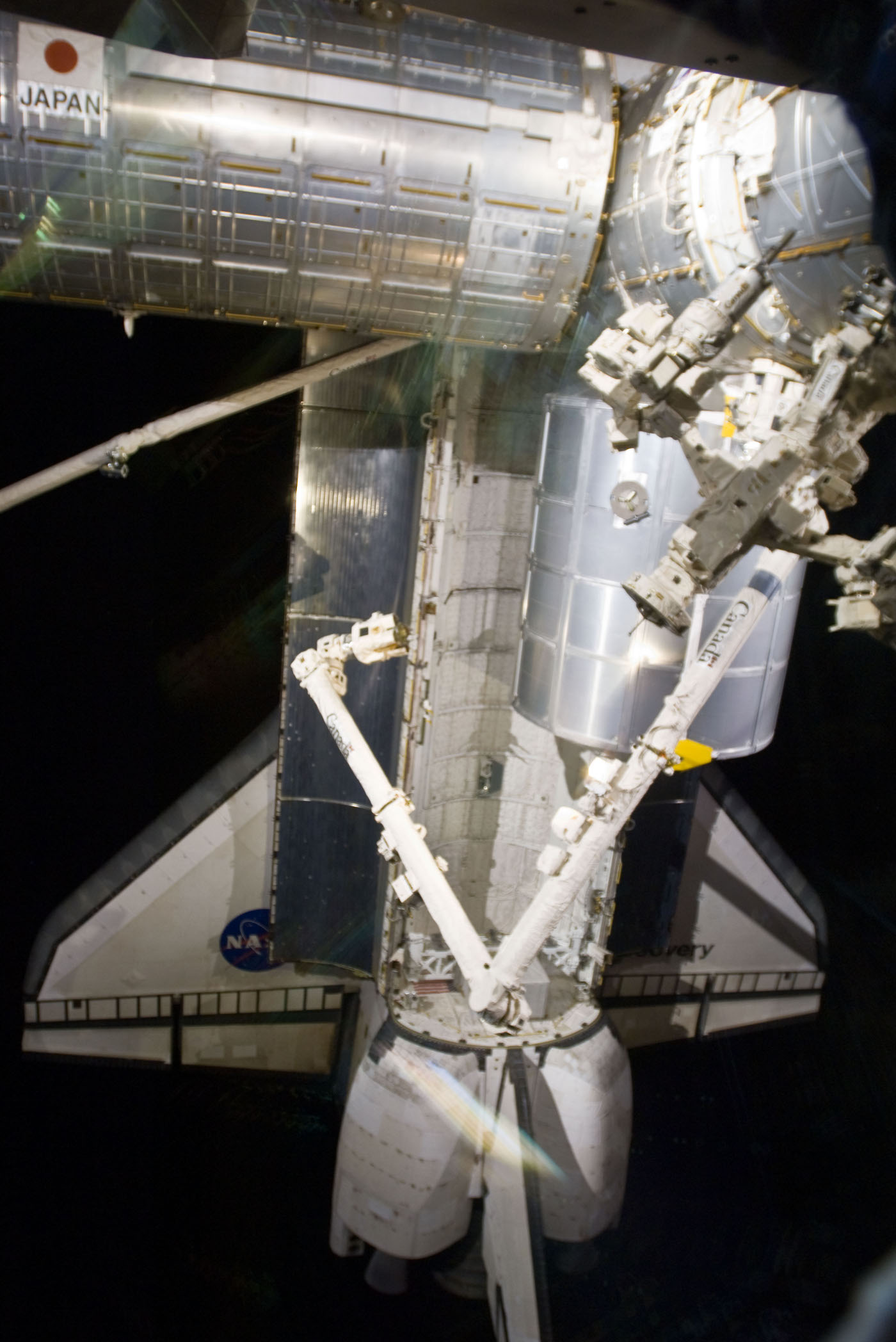
MPLM berthed to Harmony nadir

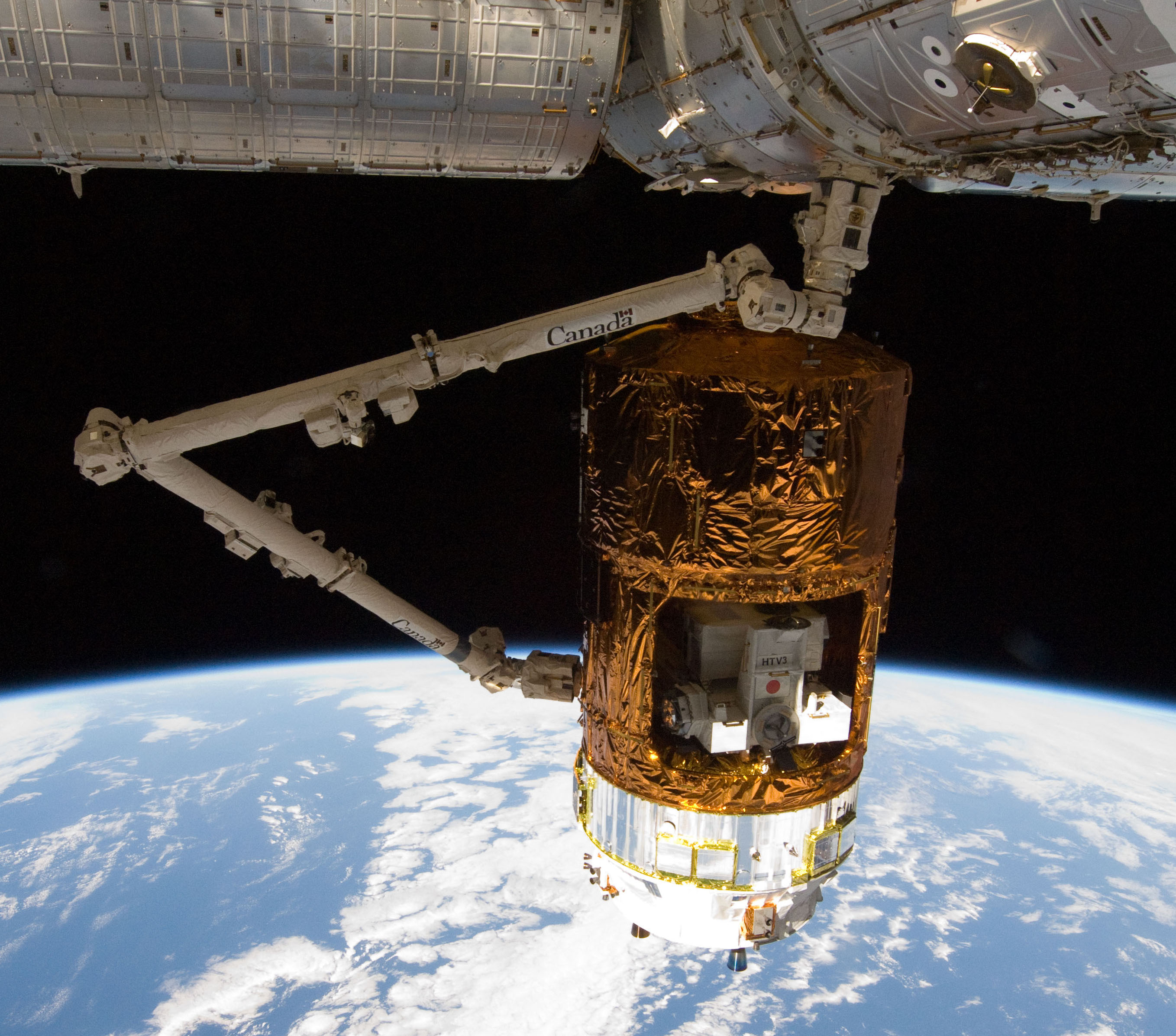
HTV being berthed to Harmony nadir

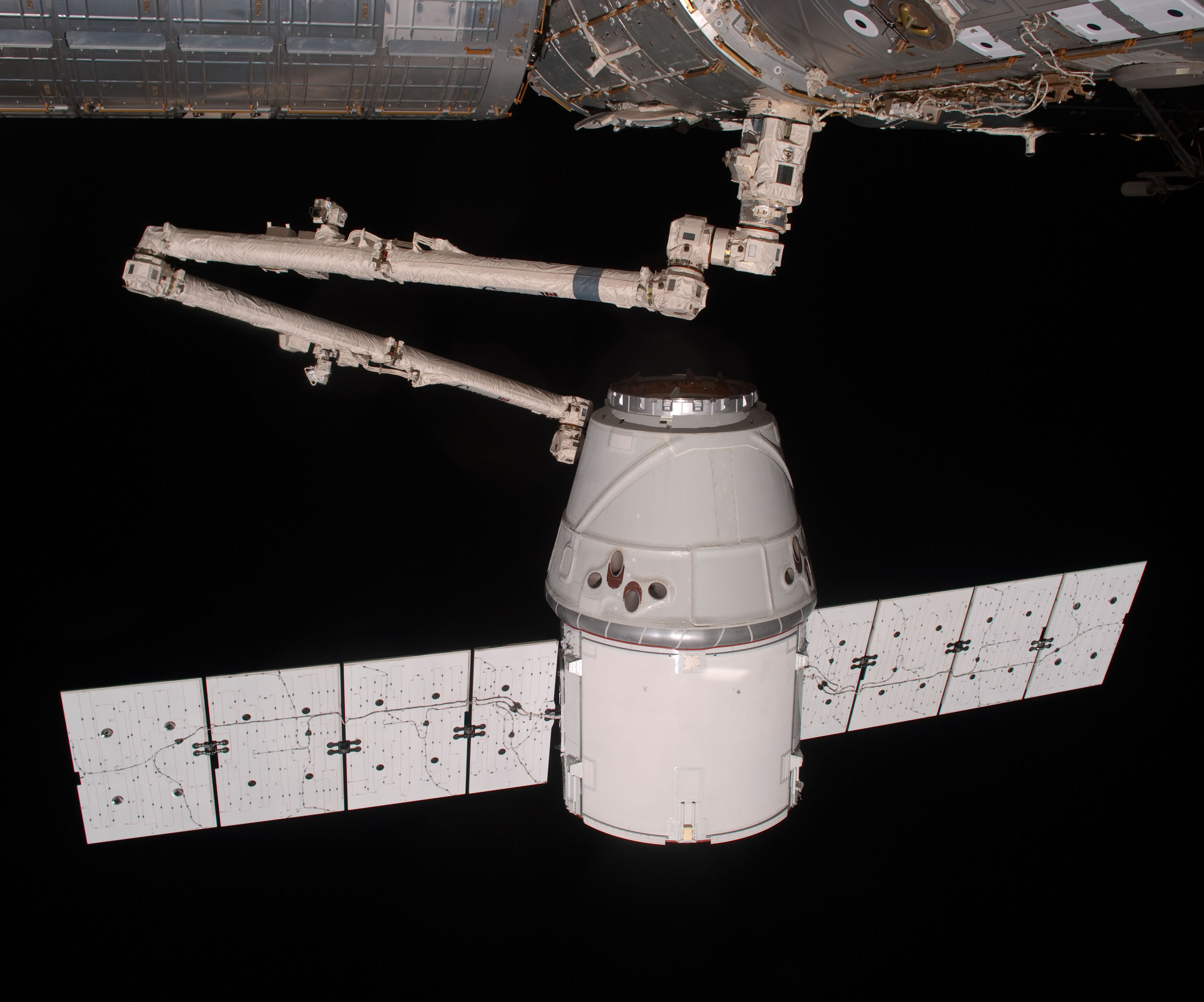
Dragon being berthed to Harmony nadir

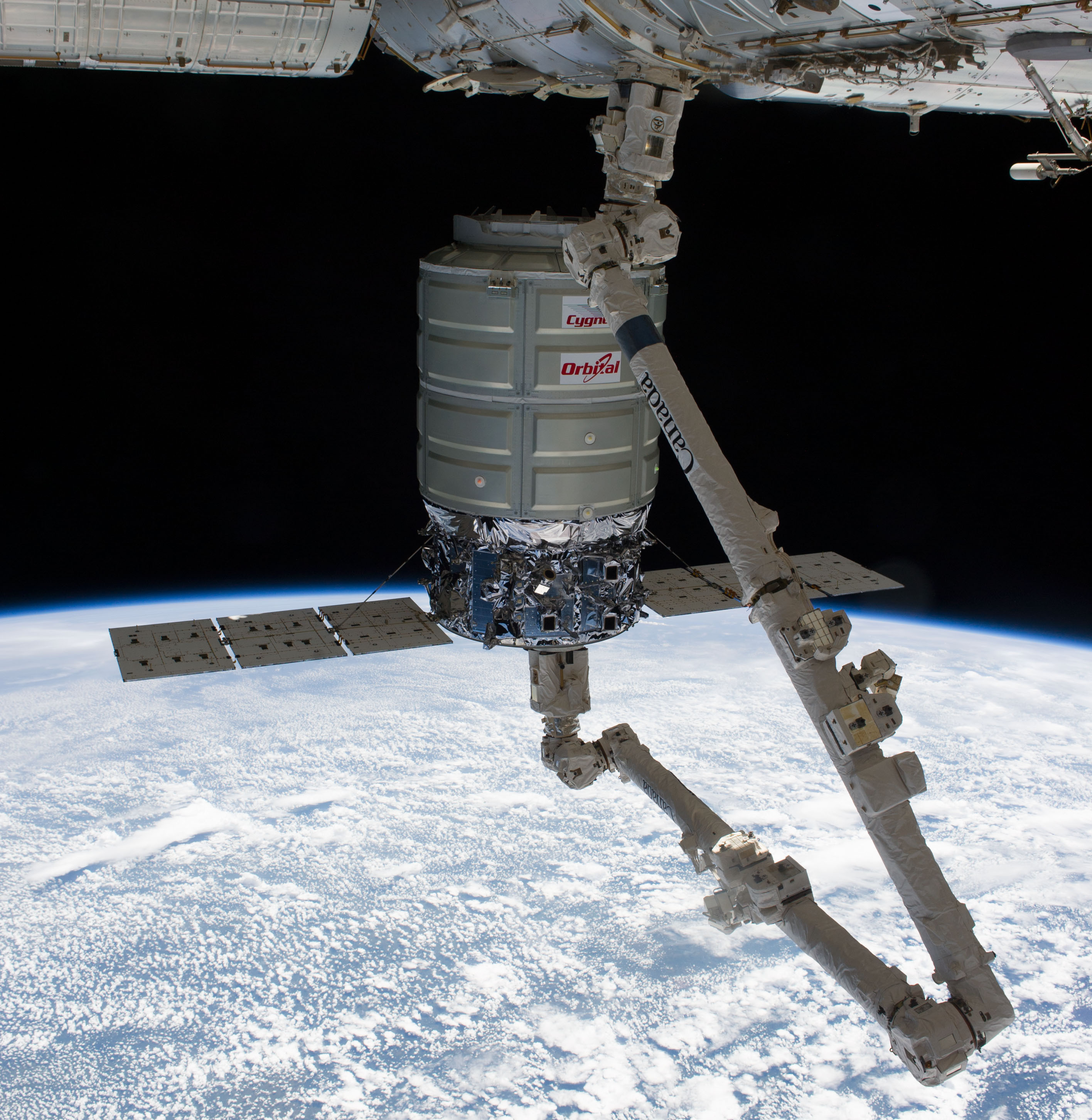
Cygnus being unberthed from Harmony nadir

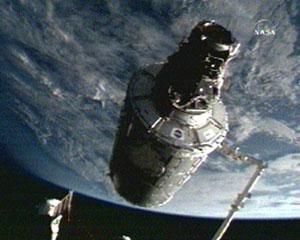
Canadarm2 moving the Harmony module

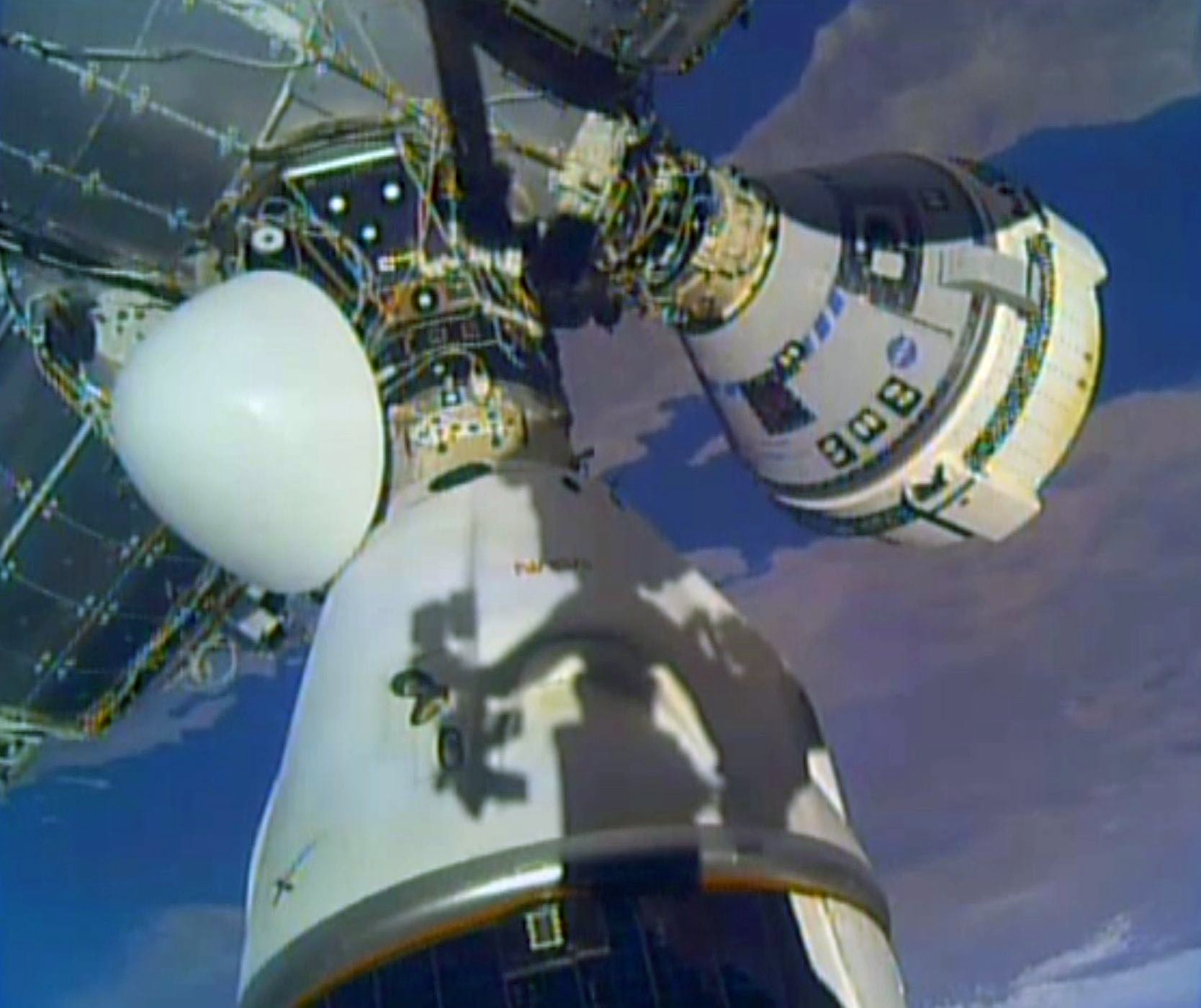
Starliner and Dragon crew vehicles docked to forward and zenith ports of Harmony
