= Multi-Purpose Logistics Module =

Large pressurized container for cargo resupply of the International Space Station

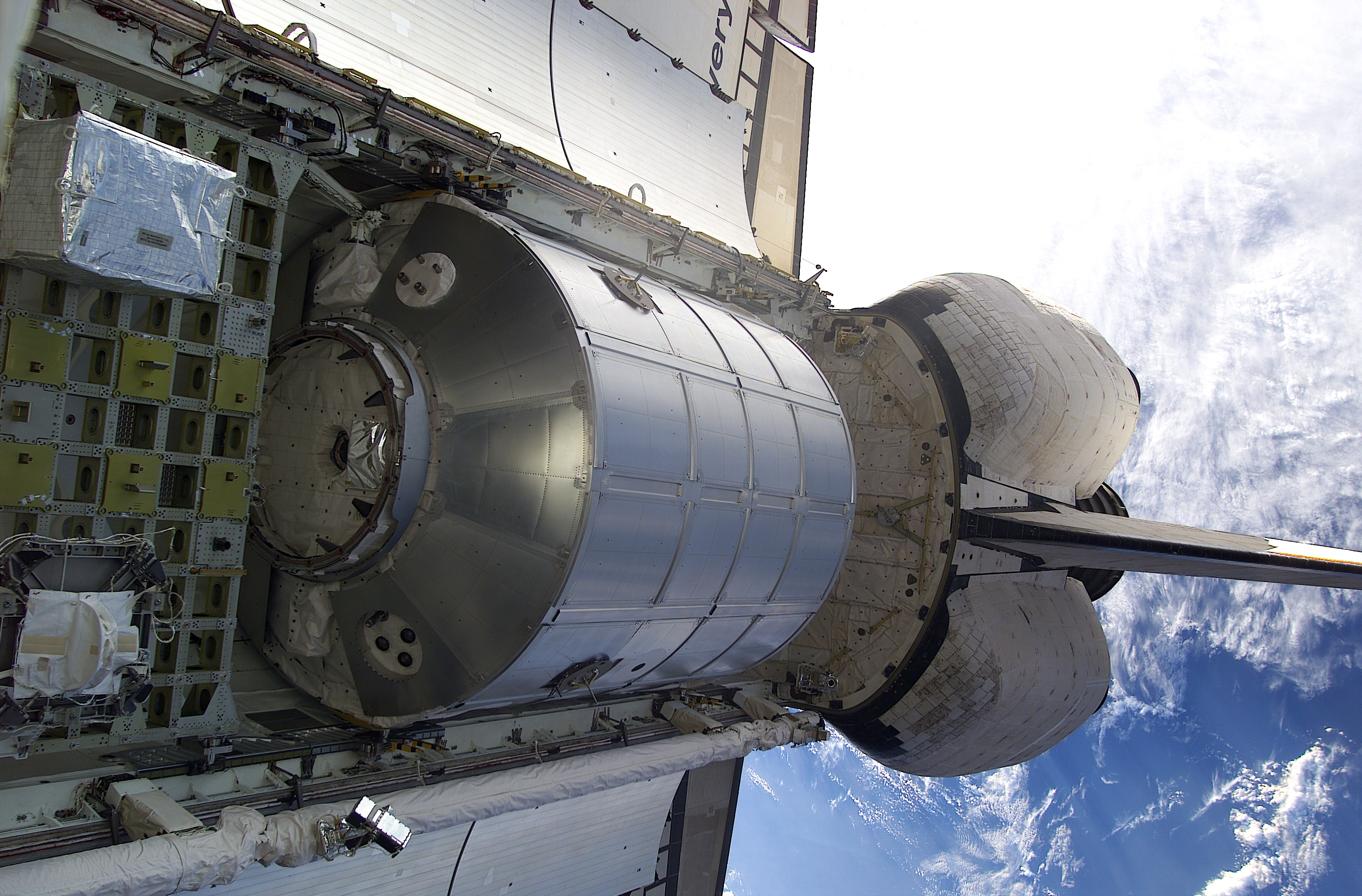
The Leonardo Multi-Purpose Logistics Module rests in Discovery's payload bay in this view taken from the ISS by a crew member using a digital still camera during STS-102.

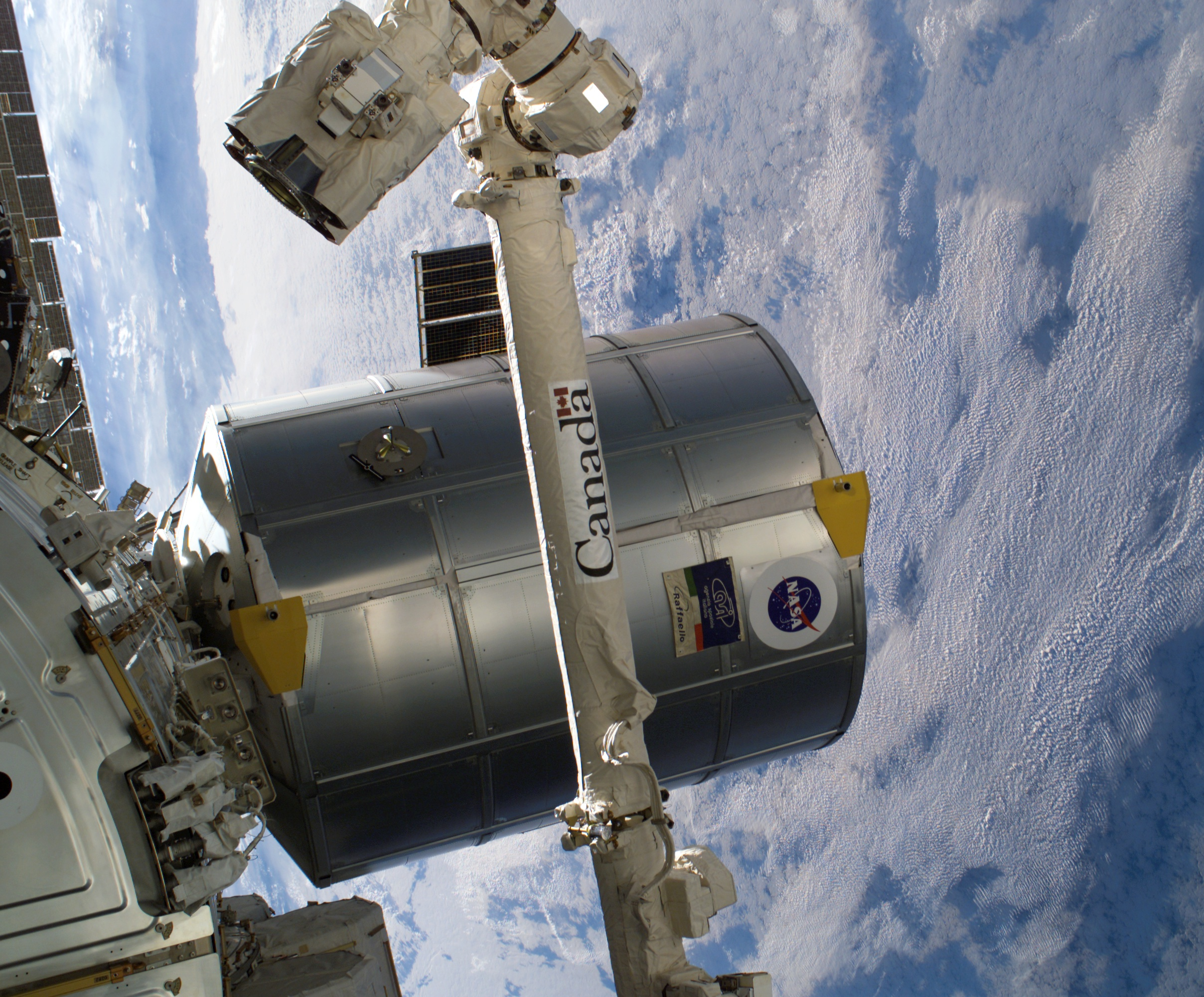
The Raffaello Multi-Purpose Logistics Module, when berthed to the ISS during STS-114

The Multi-Purpose Logistics Module (MPLM) was a large pressurized container that was used on Space Shuttle missions to transfer cargo to and from the International Space Station (ISS). Two MPLMs made a dozen trips in the Shuttle cargo bay, initially berthed to the Unity and later the Harmony module on the ISS. Once docked, supplies were offloaded, and finished experiments and waste were reloaded. The MPLM was then transferred back into the Shuttle’s cargo bay for return to Earth. Three modules were built by Alenia Aeronautica for the Italian Space Agency (ASI). They were named Leonardo, Raffaello, and Donatello.

The Leonardo module was modified in 2010 to turn it into the Permanent Multipurpose Module (PMM) and was permanently attached to the ISS during the STS-133 mission in March 2011. In July 2011, the Raffaello module was the primary payload on the final Space Shuttle mission. It returned with the Shuttle and was stored at the Kennedy Space Center. The Donatello module never launched. MPLMs were flown on 12 of the 37 Space Shuttle missions to the ISS.

The basic design of the MPLM was later used as the basis for two cargo spacecraft, the European Automated Transfer Vehicle and the American Cygnus.

== History ==
The modules were provided to NASA under contract by the Italian Space Agency (ASI). Three MPLMs were built and delivered to NASA and were named the ASI to honor some of the great talents in Italian history: Leonardo da Vinci, Raffaello and Donatello. Although built by ASI, the modules are owned by NASA. In exchange for building the MPLMs, ASI receives access to U.S. research time on the ISS.

The MPLMs have a heritage that goes back to Spacelab. In addition, ESA's Columbus module, the Harmony and Tranquility ISS modules and the ATV and Cygnus resupply craft all trace their origins to the MPLMs. The MPLM concept was originally created for Space Station Freedom. Initially, they were to be built by Boeing, but in 1992, the Italians announced that they would build a "Mini-Pressurized Logistics Module", able to carry 4,500 kilograms (4.5 t) of cargo. After the 1993 redesign of Freedom, the length was doubled and it was renamed the "Multi-Purpose Logistics Module". Each empty MPLM is approximately 21 feet (6.4 m) long, 15 feet (4.6 m) in diameter, weighs 4,400 kilograms (9,700 lb), and can deliver up to nine metric tons of cargo to the ISS.

Donatello was a more capable module than its two siblings, as it was designed to carry payloads that required continuous power from construction through to installation on the ISS. However, Donatello was never used and some of its parts were cannibalized to convert Leonardo into the PMM.

By the end of the Space Shuttle program in 2011, the Raffaello and Leonardo modules were flown a combined total of 12 times.

== Design ==
The MPLM was a large cylinder equipped with a common berthing mechanism at one end, and grapple fixtures to allow the Canadarm-2 to move it from the shuttle bay to a berthing port on the US Orbital Segment of the ISS.

=== Power during launch ===
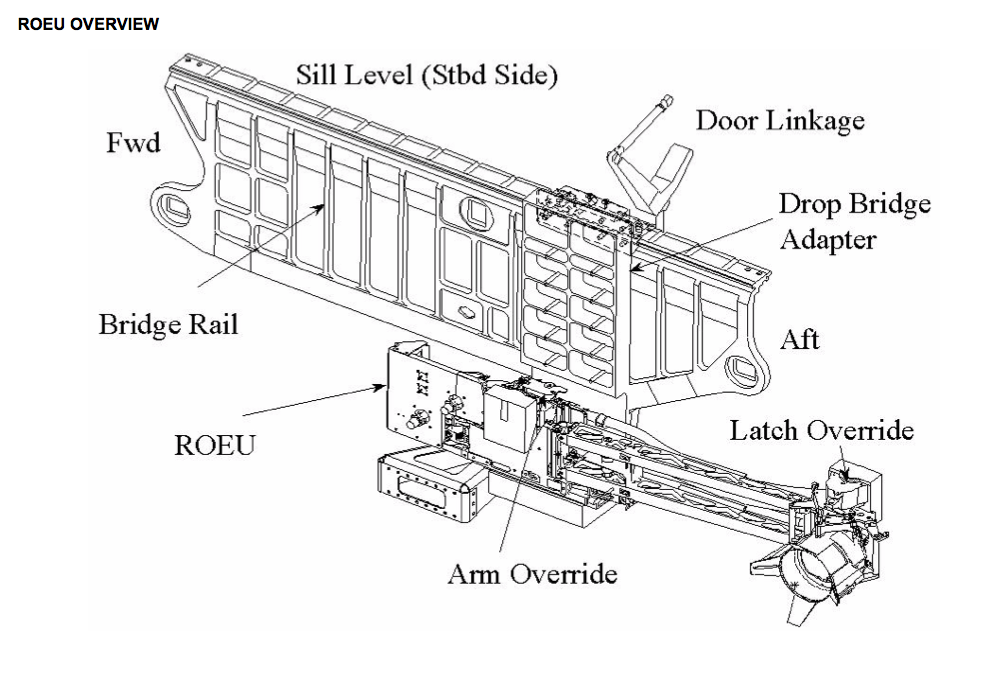
Remotely Operated Electrical Umbilical diagram

In order to provide power to equipment and experiments inside the MPLM during launch, the MPLM could be connected to the Shuttle's power supply by means of the Remotely Operated Electrical Umbilical (ROEU). The umbilical was mounted on the starboard side payload bay sidewall longeron, and was a folding arm umbilical that connected to the MPLM while it was in the payload bay. The arm was disconnected and retracted prior to the MPLM being removed for placement on the ISS and then reconnected once the MPLM was placed back inside the payload bay.

== Program logo ==
MPLM logo

Since the module names are also the names of three of the four Teenage Mutant Ninja Turtles, the NASA MPLM Group approached Mirage Studios artist A.C. Farley to design a logo featuring Raphael in an astronaut flight suit. There were cloisonné pins produced, as well as stickers and embroidered patches. Because the Ninja Turtles were created by Mirage Studios and owned by them at the time (now owned by Paramount Skydance, formerly ViacomCBS, via Nickelodeon), NASA gave Mirage the copyright to the logo in exchange for the use of the studio's character on it.

== Missions ==
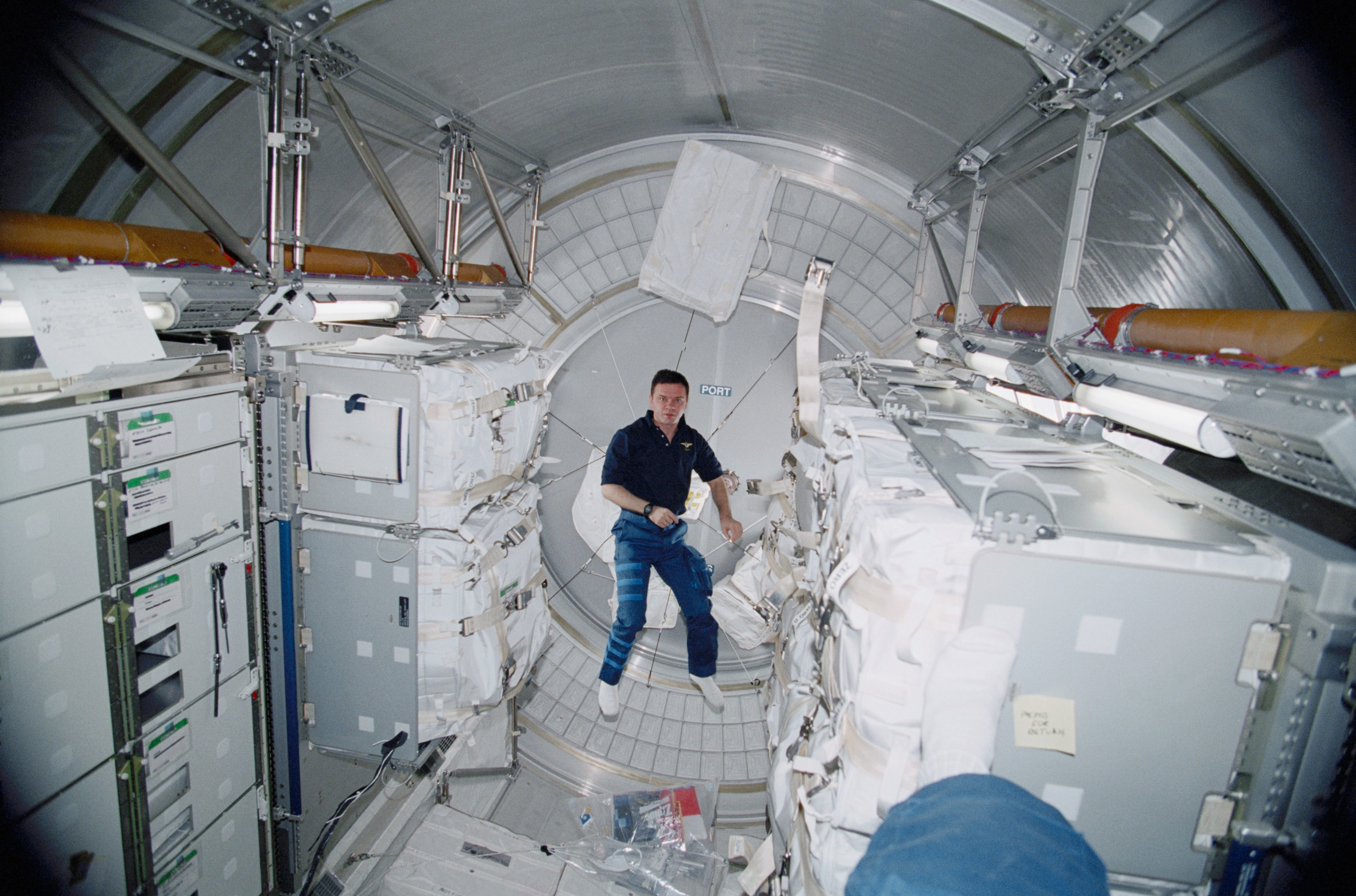
Cosmonaut Yuri Gidzenko in Leonardo in 2001

Flight	Launch date	Mission	Shuttle	MPLM	Mass up (kg)	Mass down (kg)
1	8 March 2001	STS-102 ISS 5A.1	Discovery	Leonardo	10,213	6,540
2	19 April 2001	STS-100 ISS 6A	Endeavour	Raffaello	8,811	6,763
3	10 August 2001	STS-105 ISS 7A.1	Discovery	Leonardo	9,467	7,799
4	5 December 2001	STS-108 ISS UF-1	Endeavour	Raffaello	9,228	8,693
5	5 June 2002	STS-111 ISS UF-2	Endeavour	Leonardo	10,753	9,140
6	26 July 2005	STS-114 ISS LF 1	Discovery	Raffaello	8,301	9,110
7	4 July 2006	STS-121 ISS ULF 1.1	Discovery	Leonardo	9,588	8,124
8	14 November 2008	STS-126 ISS ULF 2	Endeavour	Leonardo	12,748	6,966
9	28 August 2009	STS-128 ISS 17A	Discovery	Leonardo	12,601	8,927
10	5 April 2010	STS-131 ISS 19A	Discovery	Leonardo	12,371	9,242
11	24 February 2011	STS-133 ISS ULF 5	Discovery	Leonardo PMM		Part of ISS
12	8 July 2011	STS-135 ISS ULF 7	Atlantis	Raffaello	9,500	5,660

== Specifications ==
The following are the specifications of the MPLM:

- Length – 6.6 m (cylindrical part 4.8 m)
- Width – 4.57 m
- Mass – 4,082 kg empty; 13,154 kg fully loaded
- Habitable volume – 31 m^{3}
- Material – stainless steel

== Future use ==
The Donatello MPLM has been converted by Lockheed Martin into a Habitat Ground Test Article (HGTA) Lunar habitat prototype which is located at NASA KSC. Leonardo is permanently attached to the ISS as PMM and should reenter in the atmosphere with it. Raffaello is located at an Axiom Space facility near Houston, in preparation to undergo work to become an element for the Axiom Commercial Space Station.

== See also ==
- Automated Transfer Vehicle
- List of Space Shuttle missions
- International Space Station
