= Unity (ISS module) =

American module of the International Space Station

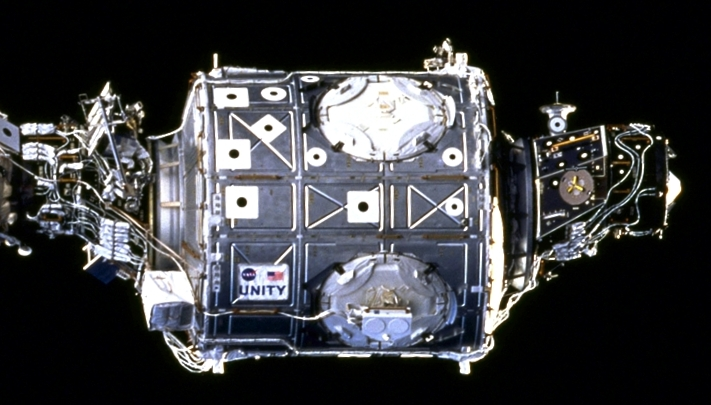
- Unity as pictured by Space Shuttle Endeavour shortly after it was berthed to Zarya in December 1998

Module statistics
- COSPAR ID: 1998-069F
- Part of: International Space Station
- Launch date: December 4, 1998, 08:35:34 UTC
- Launch vehicle: Space Shuttle Endeavour
- Berthed: December 6, 1998 (Zarya forward)
- Mass: 11,612 kg (25,600 lb)
- Length: 5.47 m (17.9 ft)
- Diameter: 4.57 m (15.0 ft)

Unity, also known as Node 1, is the first U.S.-built component of the International Space Station (ISS). This cylindrical module, constructed of aluminium by Boeing for NASA, serves as the critical link between the orbiting laboratory's Russian Orbital Segment and US Orbital Segment.

Unity was launched on December 4, 1998, aboard the Space Shuttle Endeavour on STS-88. Two days later it was berthed to the previously launched Zarya module, marking the first connection between ISS components. Its six Common Berthing Mechanism (CBM) locations (forward, aft, port, starboard, zenith, and nadir) facilitate connections to other modules. At launch, two CBM locations were fitted with Pressurized Mating Adapters (PMA), one of which enabled the mating with Zarya.

Measuring 4.57 metres (15.0 ft) in diameter and 5.47 metres (17.9 ft) in length, Unity was built at NASA's Marshall Space Flight Center. It is the first of three connecting modules, joined by Harmony and Tranquility.

== Launch and initial berthing ==
Unity (with its two attached PMAs) was carried into orbit as the primary cargo of the Space Shuttle Endeavour (OV 105) on STS-88, the first Space Shuttle mission dedicated to assembly of the station. On December 6, 1998, the STS-88 crew mated the docking port of the PMA on the aft berthing port of Unity with the forward hatch of the already orbiting Zarya module. (Zarya was a mixed Russian-U.S. funded and Russian-built component launched a few days before aboard a Russian Proton launch vehicle from Baikonur, Kazakhstan.)

== Connecting modules and visiting vehicles ==
Unity has two axial and four radial Common Berthing Mechanism (CBM) ports. In addition to connecting to the Zarya module, Unity connects to the U.S. Destiny Laboratory Module (added on STS-98), the Z1 truss (an early exterior framework for the station added on STS-92), the PMA-3 (also added on STS-92), and the Quest Joint Airlock (added on STS-104). During STS-120 the Harmony module was temporarily berthed to the port-side hatch of Unity. Tranquility, with its multi-windowed cupola, was attached to Unity's port side during the STS-130 mission, and Leonardo was added to the nadir hatch during STS-133.

In addition, the Leonardo and Raffaello Multi-Purpose Logistics Modules were each berthed to Unity on multiple missions.

Forward

- PMA-2, launch–2001 (relocated to Destiny forward in 2001 and again to Harmony forward in 2007)
  - STS-96, May 27, 1999, 10:49–June 6, 1999, 02:02
  - STS-101, May 20, 2000, 04:30–May 26, 2000, 23:03
  - STS-106, September 8, 2000, 12:45–September 19, 2000, 07:56
  - STS-92, October 11, 2000, 23:17–October 24, 2000, 20:59
- Destiny, 2001–present

Aft

- PMA-1, launch–present
  - Zarya (via PMA-1), December 6, 1998–present

Port

- PMA-3, March 2001–August 30, 2007
- Harmony, October 26–November 12, 2007
- PMA-3, August 7, 2009–January 25, 2010
- Tranquility, February 12, 2010–present

Starboard

- Quest, July 15, 2001–present

Zenith

- Z1 truss, October 14, 2000–present

Nadir

- PMA-3, October 16, 2000–March 2001
  - STS-97, December 2–9, 2000
  - STS-98, February 9–16, 2001
- PMA-3, August 30, 2007–August 7, 2009
- Leonardo, March 1–May 27, 2015
- CRS OA-4, December 9, 2015–February 19, 2016
- CRS OA-6, March 26–June 14, 2016
- CRS OA-5, October 17–November 27, 2016
- CRS OA-7, April 22–June 4, 2017
- CRS OA-8E, November 14–December 5, 2017
- CRS OA-9E, May 24–July 15, 2018
- CRS NG-10, November 19, 2018–February 8, 2019
- CRS NG-11, April 19–August 6, 2019
- CRS NG-12, November 4, 2019–January 31, 2020
- CRS NG-13, February 18–May 11, 2020
- CRS NG-14, October 5, 2020–January 26, 2021
- CRS NG-15, February 20–June 29, 2021
- CRS NG-16, August 12–December 15, 2021
- CRS NG-17, February 21–June 28, 2022
- CRS NG-18, November 9, 2022–April 21, 2023
- CRS NG-19, August 4–December 22, 2023
- CRS NG-20, February 1–July 12, 2024
- CRS NG-21, August 6, 2024–March 28, 2025
- CRS NG-23, September 18, 2025–March 14, 2026
- CRS NG-24, April 13–October 9, 2026

== Details ==
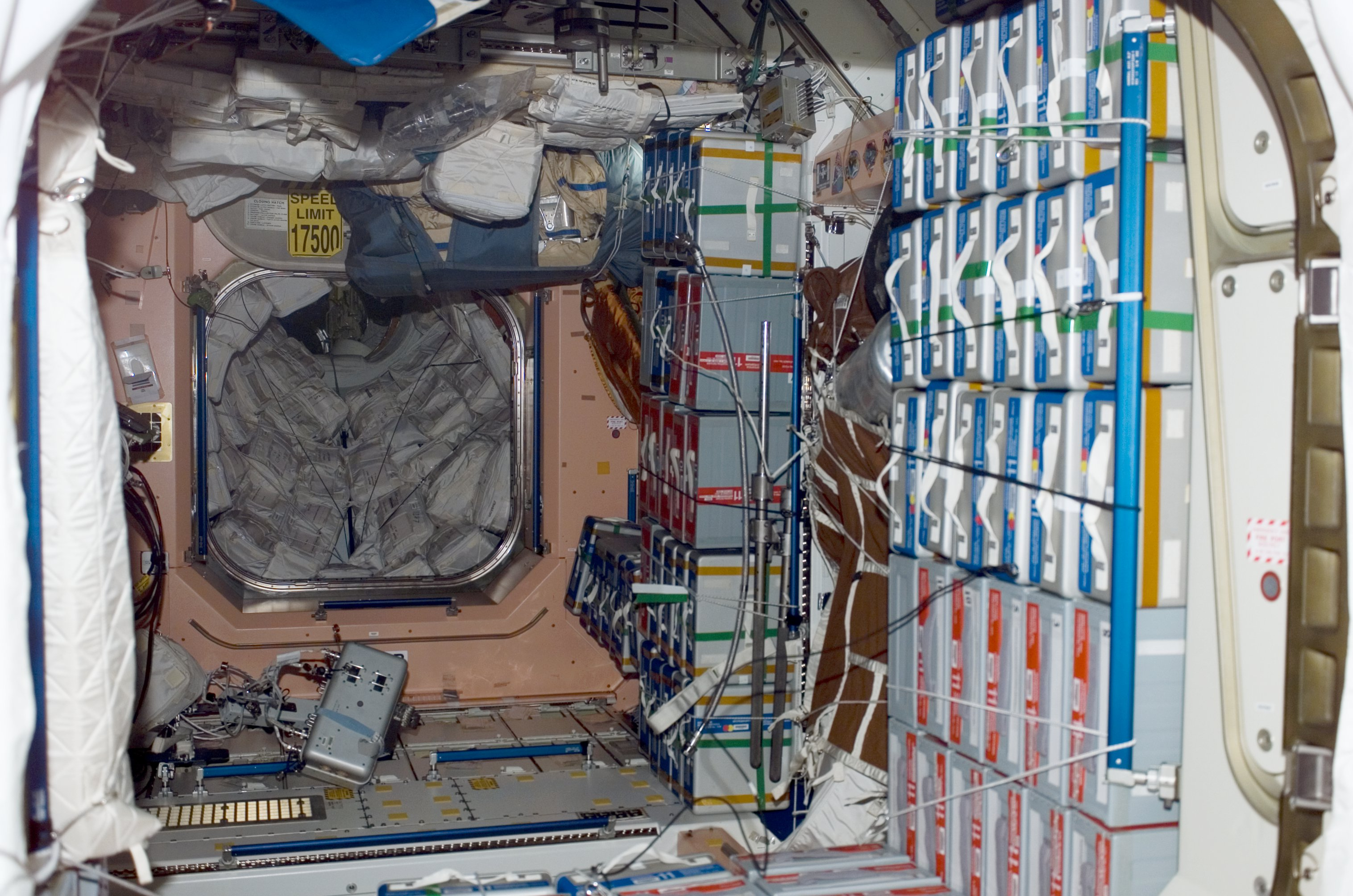
Interior of Node 1 (As of 2005)

Essential space station resources such as fluids, environmental control and life support systems, electrical and data systems are routed through Unity to supply work and living areas of the station. More than 50,000 mechanical items, 216 lines to carry fluids and gases, and 121 internal and external electrical cables using six miles of wire were installed in the Unity node. The primary structure of Unity is constructed of aluminium.

During the space station construction, a crew member placed two speed limit signs on the hatch (leading into the FGB) in 2003, noting the orbital velocity in mph and km/h.

Prior to its launch aboard Endeavour, conical Pressurized Mating Adapters (PMAs) were attached to the aft and forward berthing mechanisms of Unity. Unity and the two mating adapters together weighed about 11,600 kg (25,600 lb). The adapters allow the docking systems used by the Space Shuttle and by Russian modules to attach to the node's hatches and berthing mechanisms. PMA-1 now permanently attaches Unity to Zarya, while PMA-2 provided a Shuttle docking port. Attached to the exterior of PMA-1 are computers, or multiplexer-demultiplexers (MDMs), which provided early command and control of Unity. Unity also is outfitted with an early communications system that allows data, voice and low data rate video with Mission Control Houston, to supplement Russian communications systems during the early station assembly activities. PMA-3 was attached to Unity's nadir berthing mechanism by the crew of STS-92.

== Other nodes ==
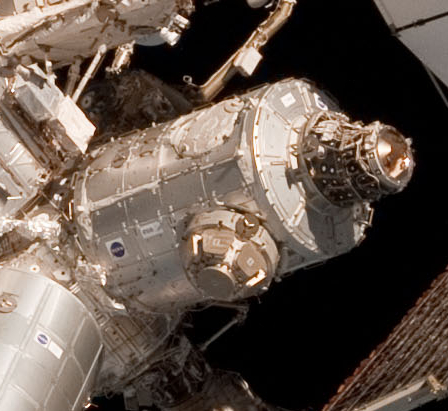
Node 3 (Tranquility) in space

The two remaining station connecting modules, or nodes, were manufactured in Italy by Alenia Aerospazio, as part of an agreement between NASA and the European Space Agency (ESA). Harmony (also known as Node 2) and Tranquility (also known as Node 3) are slightly longer than Unity, measuring almost 6.4 m (21 ft) long in total. In addition to their six berthing ports, each can hold eight International Standard Payload Racks (ISPRs). Unity, in comparison, holds just four ISPRs. ESA built Nodes 2 and 3 as partial payment for the launch aboard the Shuttle of the Columbus laboratory module, and other ESA equipment.
