= International Standard Payload Rack =

Steel container used in the International Space Station

Technical diagram of ISPR

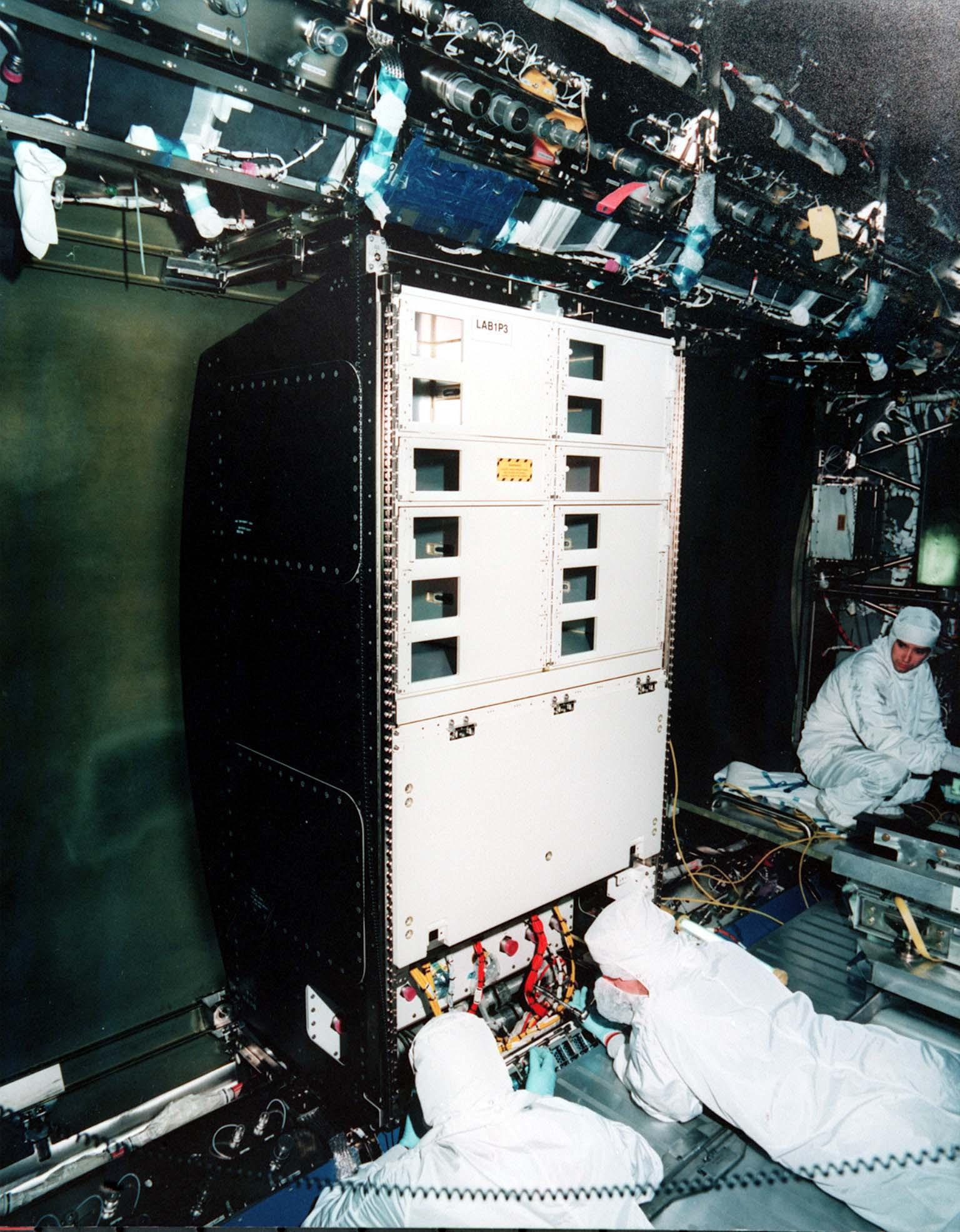
An ISPR being fitted in the US Destiny lab module

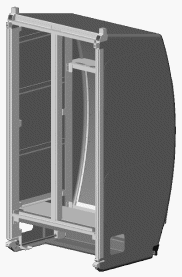
International Standard Payload Rack

The International Standard Payload Rack (ISPR) is a steel framework container that is designed and been adopted by the International Space Station (ISS) program to support efficient integration and interchangeability of space payload hardware, such as machines and experiments. A typical rack contains 37 ISPR slots for science payloads, which are interchangeable to accommodate different components or payloads.

== Capabilities ==
Each ISPR provides 1.571 m^{3} (55.5 cu ft) of internal volume being about 2 m (79 in) high, 1.05 m (41 in) wide, and 85.9 cm (33.8 in) deep. The rack weighs 104 kg (230 lb) and can accommodate an additional 700 kg (1,500 lb) of payload equipment. The rack has internal mounting provisions to allow attachment of secondary structure. The ISPRs will be outfitted with a thin center post to accommodate sub-rack-sized payloads, such as the 483 mm (19-inch rack) Spacelab Standard Interface Rack (SIR) Drawer or the Space Shuttle Middeck Locker. Utility pass-through ports are located on each side to allow cables to be run between Racks. Module attachment points are provided at the top of the rack and via pivot points at the bottom. The pivot points support installation and maintenance. Tracks on the exterior front posts allow mounting of payload equipment and laptop computers. Additional adapters on the ISPRs are provided for ground handling.

== Compatibility ==
The International Standard Payload Rack is the size of a side-by-side refrigerator, and is too big to fit through the Russian probe and drogue docking system, APAS, or NDS docking systems, and therefore cannot be transferred directly from a Progress, ATV, or the interior of the Space Shuttle to the ISS. In the past ISPRs were delivered in Multi-Purpose Logistics Modules, which were carried in the Space Shuttle cargo bay and berthed to CBM ports. Cygnus spacecraft hatches are too narrow to fit ISPRs with their 37 inches (94 cm) wide openings and Cargo Dragon 1 spacecraft have no capability to either launch or return ISPRs because of the design of the pressurized section of the Cargo Dragon 1 spacecraft which can only transport cargo bags and smaller racks. Cargo Dragon 2 spacecraft have 31 inches (79 cm) wide hatch openings and can not fit the 41.3 inches (105 cm) wide ISPRs. As of 2020 ISPRs can only be delivered using the Japanese H-II Transfer Vehicle.

== Other ISPR systems ==
Japan has developed an ISPR with interfaces and capabilities nearly identical to NASA's.

== See also ==
- Columbus European Laboratory
- US Laboratory
- Japanese Experiment Module (JEM)
- Node 1
- Multi-Purpose Logistics Module
