= Mark L. Polansky =

American astronaut, pilot and engineer (born 1956)

Mark Polansky
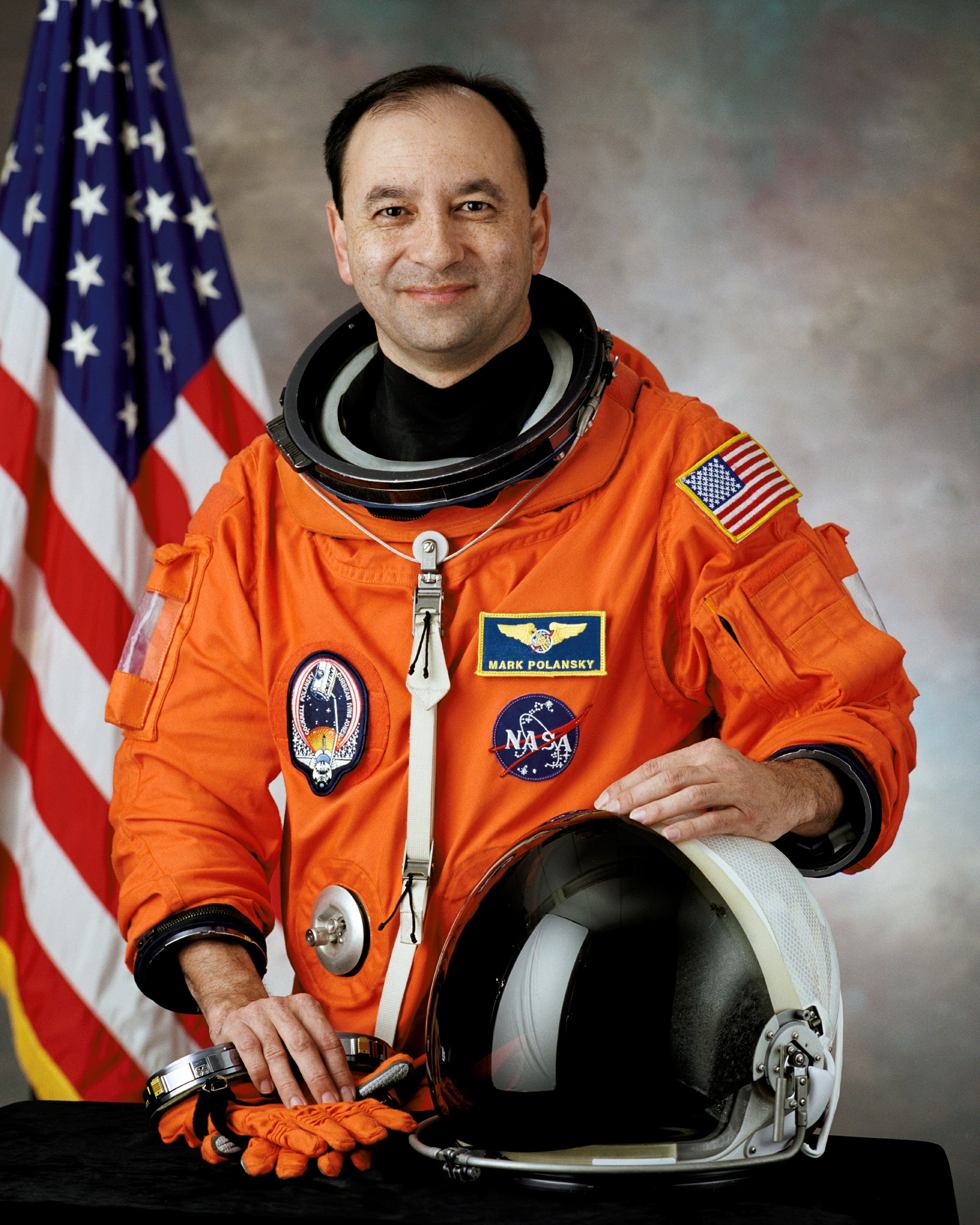
- Polansky in January 2001
- Born: Mark Lewis Polansky; June 2, 1956 (age 70); Paterson, New Jersey, U.S.
- Other name: Roman
- Education: Purdue University (BS, MS)
- Space career

NASA astronaut
- Time in space: 41d 10h 50m
- Selection: NASA Group 16 (1996)
- Missions: STS-98; STS-116; STS-127
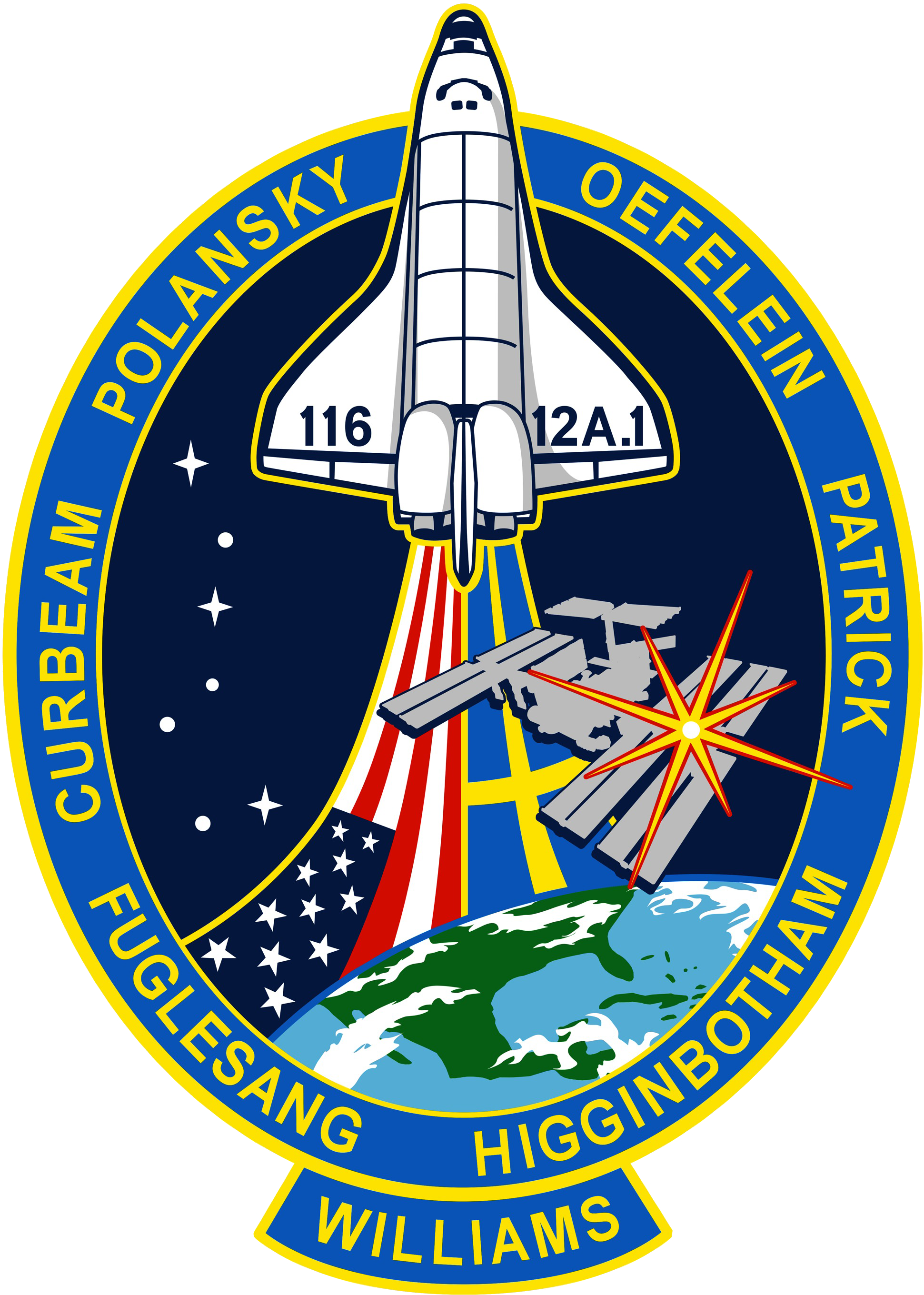
- Mission insignia

Mark Lewis Polansky (born June 2, 1956) is an American aerospace engineer and research pilot and a former NASA astronaut. Polansky received the nickname "Roman" as a joke, because he shares a last name with director Roman Polanski. He flew on three Space Shuttle missions: STS-98, STS-116, and STS-127 and was first person of Korean ancestry in space.

== Background ==
Polansky's father, Irving, was Jewish. His mother, Edith, is originally from Hawaii and is of Korean descent. Polansky was raised as a Jew, and honored his father's heritage by taking a teddy bear from the United States Holocaust Memorial Museum along for the ride on STS-116. He is married and has two kids — one daughter and one son.

== Education ==
Polansky graduated from J. P. Stevens High School in Edison, New Jersey in 1974. He received a Bachelor of Science degree in aeronautical and astronautical engineering, and a Master of Science degree in aeronautics and astronautics, from Purdue University, both in 1978.

== Military career ==
Polansky received an Air Force commission upon graduation from Purdue University in 1978. He earned his pilot wings in January 1980 at Vance AFB, Oklahoma. From 1980 to 1983, he was assigned to Langley AFB, Virginia, where he flew the F-15 aircraft. In 1983, Polansky transitioned to the F-5E aircraft and served as an Aggressor Pilot, where he trained tactical aircrews to defeat enemy aircraft tactics. He was assigned in this capacity to Clark Air Base, Republic of the Philippines, and Nellis AFB, Nevada, until he was selected to attend USAF Test Pilot School, Edwards AFB, California, in 1986. Upon graduation, he was assigned to Eglin AFB, Florida, where he conducted weapons and systems testing in the F-15, F-15E, and A-10 aircraft. Polansky left active duty in 1992 to pursue a career at NASA. He has logged over 5,000 flight hours in over 30 different aircraft.

=== NASA career ===
Polansky joined NASA in August 1992, as an aerospace engineer and research pilot. He was assigned to the Aircraft Operations Division of the Johnson Space Center. His primary responsibilities involved teaching the astronaut pilots Space Shuttle landing techniques in the Shuttle Trainer Aircraft and instructing astronaut pilots and mission specialists in the T-38 aircraft. Polansky also conducted flight testing of the NASA T-38 avionics upgrade aircraft.

Selected by NASA in April 1996, Polansky reported to the Johnson Space Center in August 1996. Having completed two years of training and evaluation, he was initially assigned as a member of the Astronaut Support Personnel team at the Kennedy Space Center, supporting Space Shuttle launches and landings. He served as pilot on STS-98 (2001) and has logged over 309 hours in space. He was next assigned as a CAPCOM. Polansky was Chief of the CAPCOM Branch from April 2002 to December 2002. He served as Chief Instructor Astronaut from April 2003 to January 2004. He has also served as Chief of the Return to Flight and Orbiter Repair Branches. Polansky's last shuttle flight as commander of Mission STS-127, an assembly flight to the International Space Station.

Polansky retired from the Astronaut Corps on June 30, 2012. "Mark is a remarkably talented individual," said Peggy Whitson, Chief of the Astronaut Office. "His skills as an aviator coupled with his engineering expertise were a valuable contribution to our team. We wish him well in his future endeavors."

== Spaceflights ==
=== STS-98 Atlantis (February 9–20, 2001) ===
The STS-98 crew continued the task of building and enhancing the International Space Station by delivering the U.S. Destiny Laboratory Module. The Shuttle spent seven days docked to the station while Destiny was attached and three spacewalks were conducted to complete its assembly. The crew also relocated a docking port, and delivered supplies and equipment to the resident Expedition 1 crew. Mission duration was 12 days, 21 hours, 20 minutes.

=== STS-116 Discovery (December 9–22, 2006) ===
The seven-member crew on this 12-day mission continued construction of the ISS outpost by adding the P5 Truss Segment during the first of four spacewalks. The next two spacewalks rewired the station's power system, preparing it to support the addition of European and Japanese science modules by future shuttle crews. The fourth spacewalk was added to allow the crew to coax and retract a stubborn solar panel to fold up accordion-style into its box. Discovery also delivered a new crew member and more than two tons of equipment and supplies to the station. Almost two tons of items no longer needed on the station returned to Earth with STS-116. Mission duration was 12 days, 20 hours and 45 minutes.

=== STS-127 Endeavour (July 15–31, 2009) ===
Polansky was the commander of the STS-127 mission, which launched aboard Space Shuttle Endeavour on July 15, 2009, from the Kennedy Space Center in Florida. During this 16-day mission, the seven-member crew installed the Japanese Exposed Facility onto the ISS, and performed five spacewalks. Polansky returned to Earth with his crew on July 31, 2009. Following fellow astronaut Michael J. Massimino's lead, Mark began posting public updates and replies to Twitter on May 7, 2009, during his training for STS-127, and continued to do so throughout the mission.

== Organizations ==
Member of the Society of Experimental Test Pilots, American Institute of Aeronautics and Astronautics, and the Aircraft Owners and Pilots Association.

== Awards and honors ==
Distinguished Graduate of the USAF Test Pilot School (1987). Distinguished Graduate of USAF Undergraduate Pilot Training (1980). Recipient of the USAF Flying Training Award (1980). Awarded Air Force Meritorious Service Medal and Air Force Commendation Medal with two Oak Leaf Clusters.

In his hometown of Edison, NJ, a park is named for him on Grove Ave., across the street from his alma mater of J. P. Stevens High School. Recently in June 2006 the township officials unveiled a sign for Mark Polansky Park while his friends and family were there with him for this presentation. He frequently returns to Edison for programs at the local library for the kids.

== See also ==
- List of Asian American astronauts
