= Robert Curbeam =

American astronaut (born 1962)

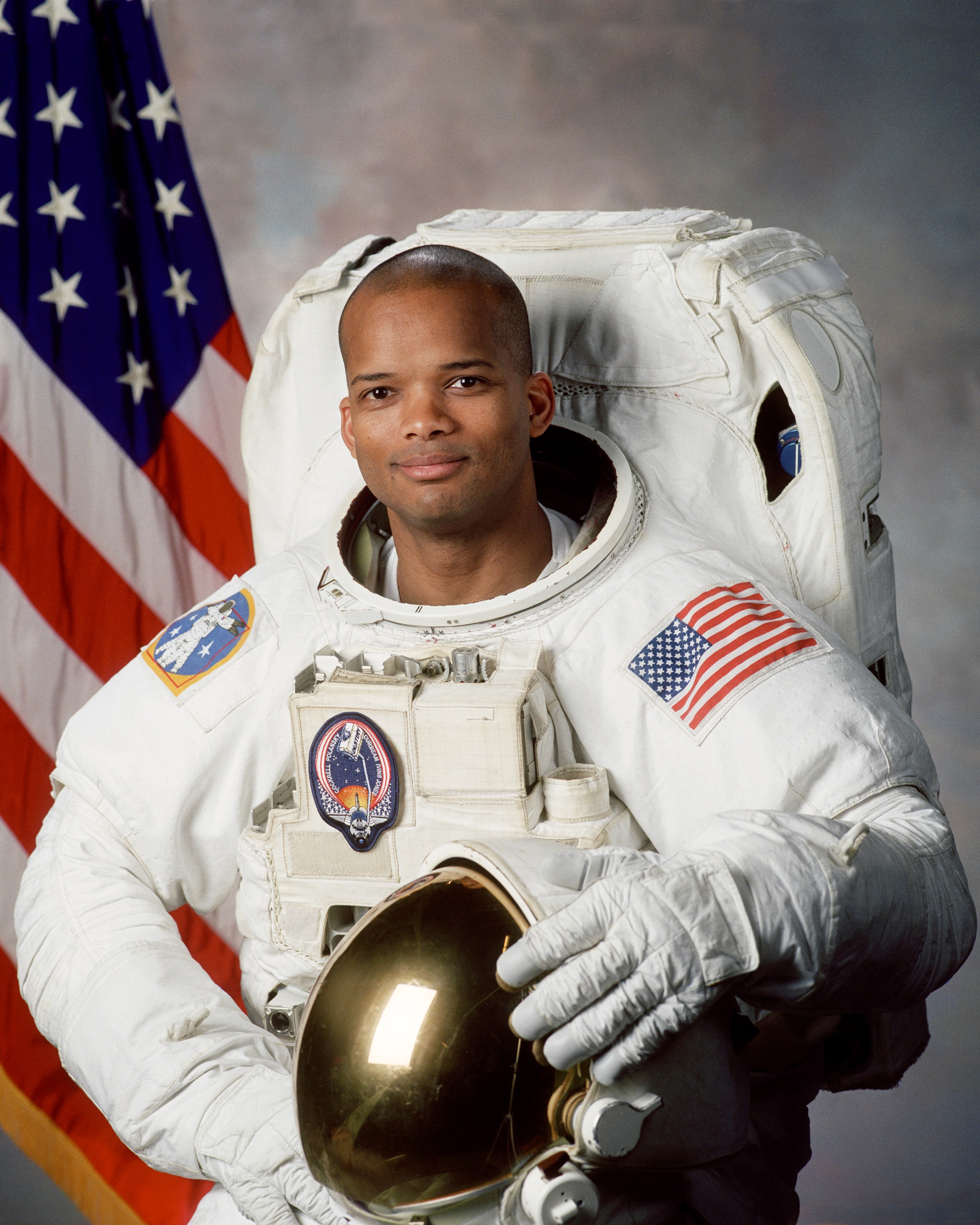
- Curbeam in January 2001
- Born: Robert Lee Curbeam Jr. March 5, 1962 (age 64); Baltimore, Maryland, U.S.
- Education: United States Naval Academy (BS); Naval Postgraduate School (MS, MS)
- Space career

NASA astronaut
- Rank: Captain, USN
- Time in space: 37d 14h 33m
- Selection: NASA Group 15 (1994)
- Total EVAs: 7
- Total EVA time: 45h 34m
- Missions: STS-85; STS-98; STS-116
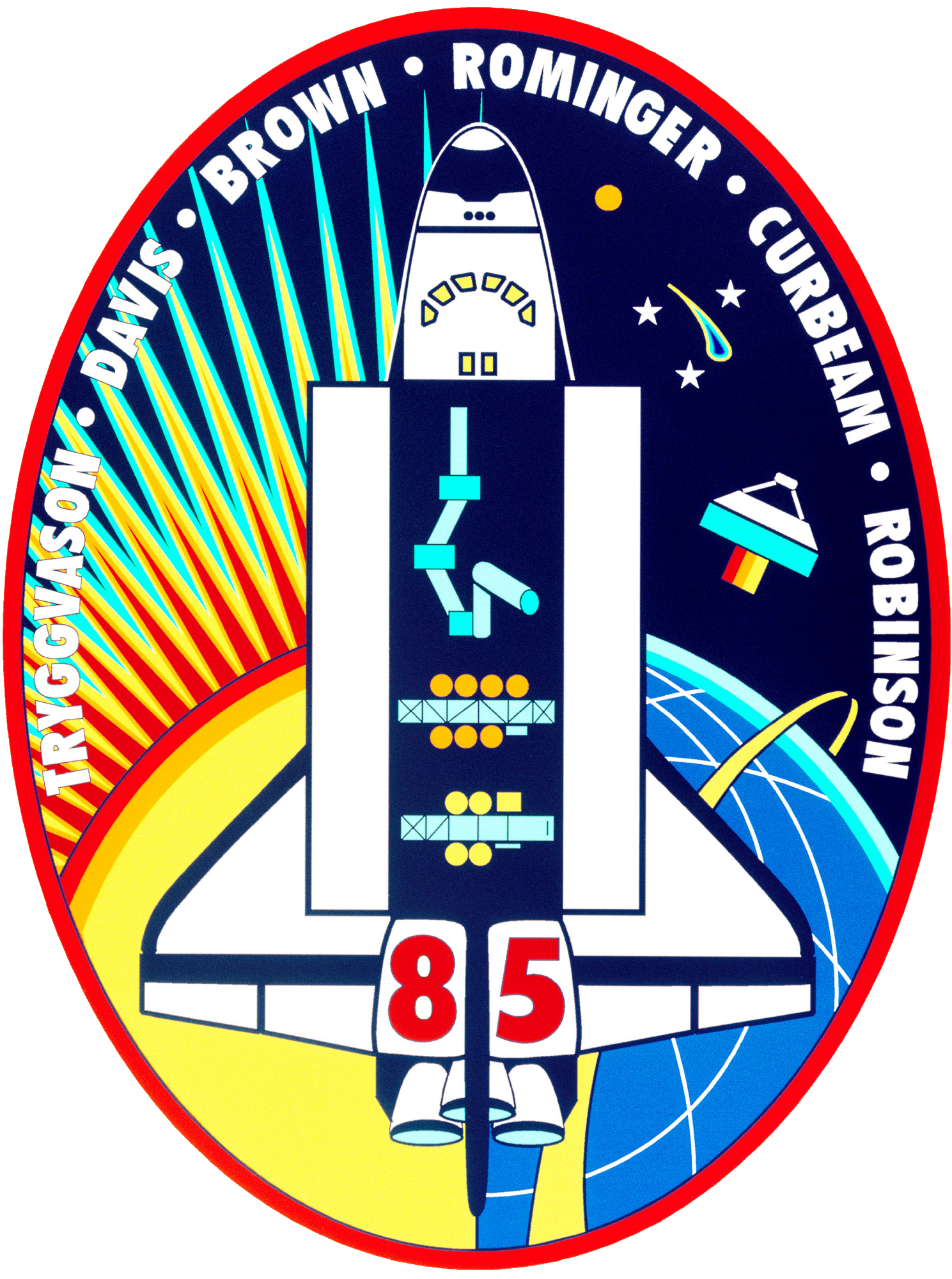
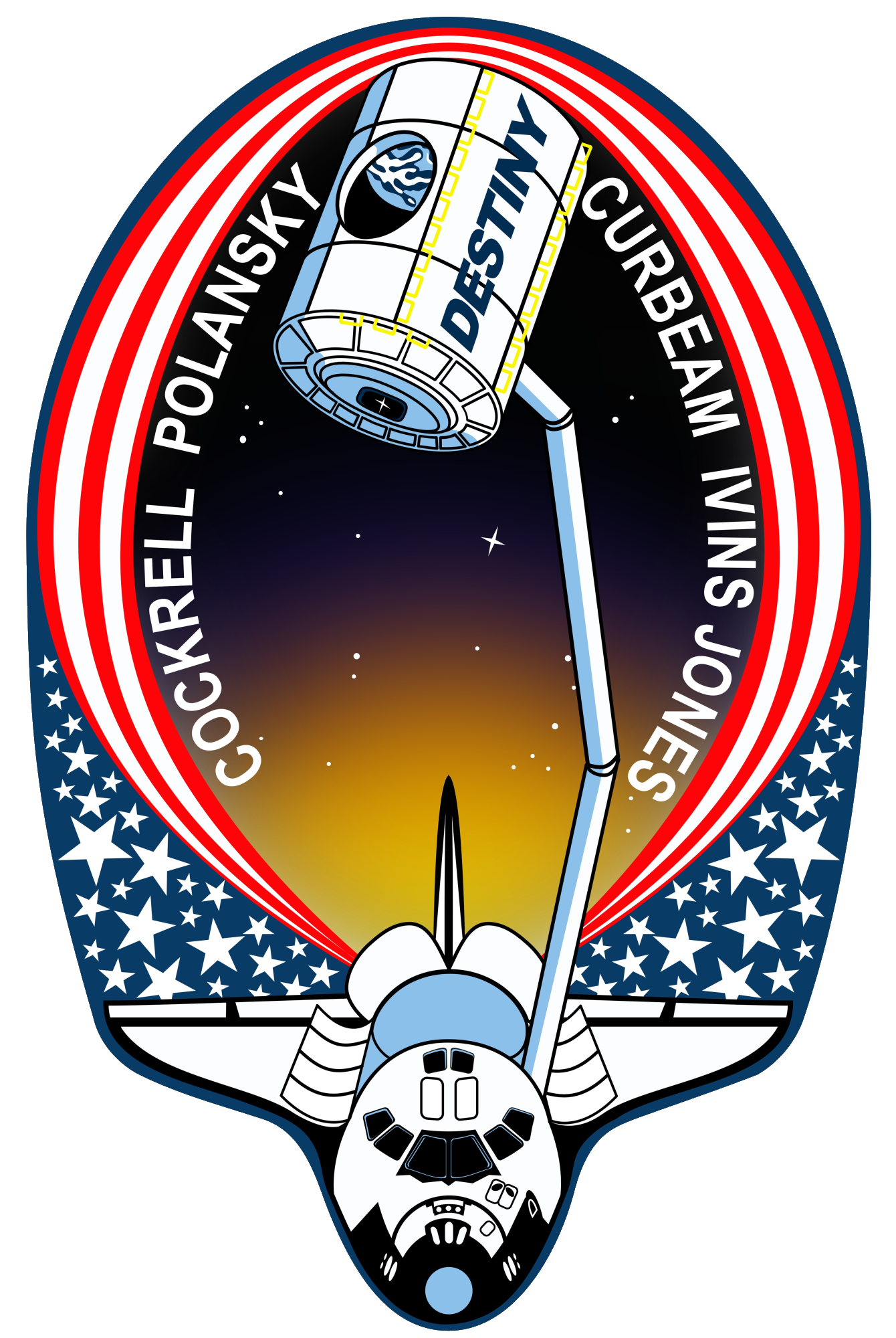
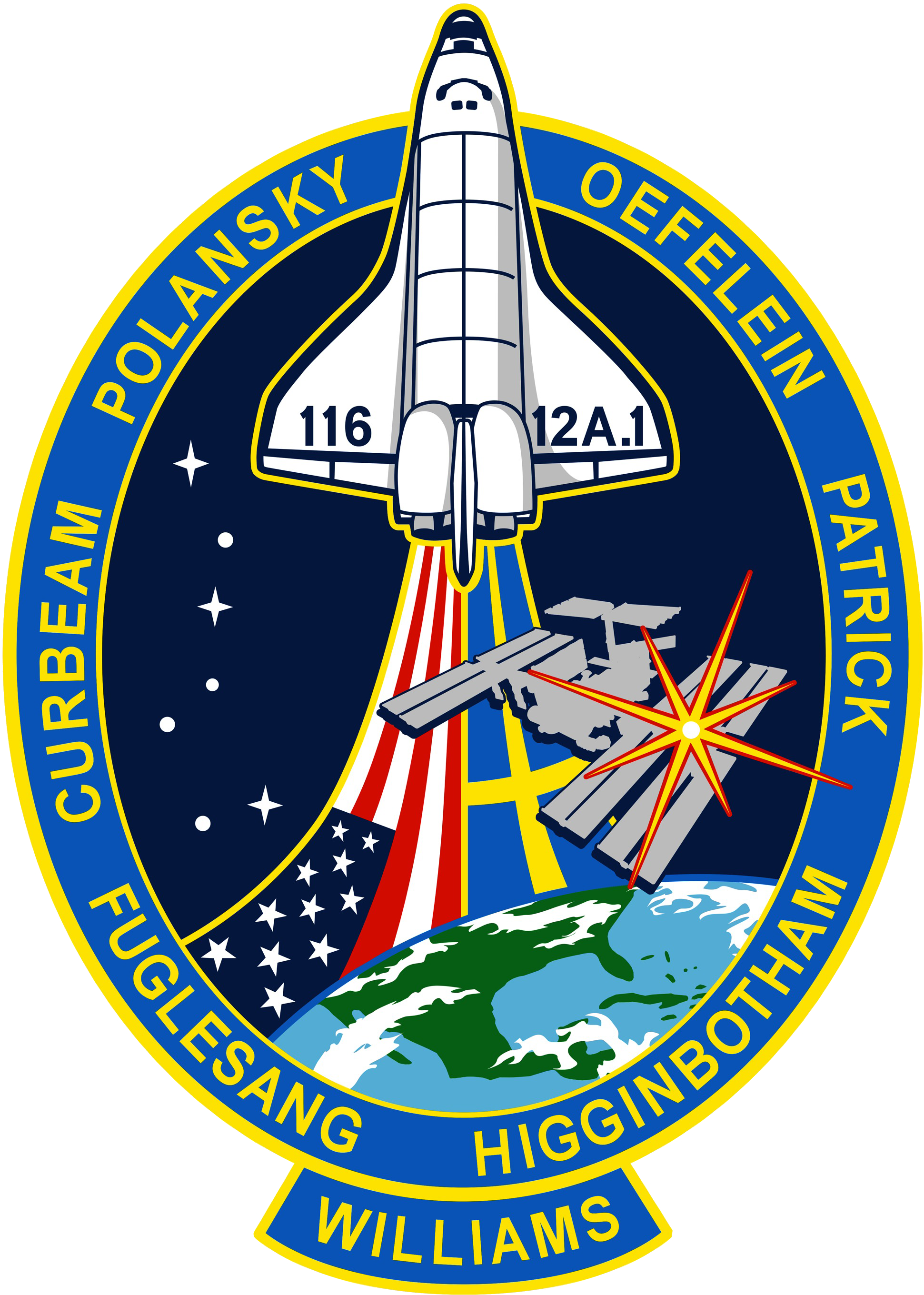
- Mission insignia

Robert Lee Curbeam Jr. (born March 5, 1962) is a former NASA astronaut and captain in the United States Navy. He currently holds the record for the most spacewalks during a single spaceflight, accomplished during the STS-116 mission, when Curbeam completed four spacewalks.

== Education ==
Curbeam graduated from Woodlawn High School, Baltimore County, Maryland in 1980. He earned a Bachelor of Science degree in aerospace engineering from the United States Naval Academy in 1984, a Master of Science degree in aeronautical engineering from the Naval Postgraduate School in 1990, and a master's degree in astronautical engineering from the Naval Postgraduate School in 1991.

Curbeam was named Fighter Wing One Radar Intercept Officer of the Year in 1989 and received the U.S. Naval Test Pilot School Best Developmental Thesis (DT-II) Award.

== Naval career ==
Upon graduation from the U.S. Naval Academy, Curbeam commenced Naval Flight Officer training in 1984. In 1986 he reported to Fighter Squadron 11 (VF-11) and made overseas deployments on board the aircraft carrier USS Forrestal. During his tour in VF-11, he also attended the Navy Fighter Weapons School.

Upon graduation of United States Naval Test Pilot School in December 1991, he reported to the Strike Aircraft Test Directorate, where he was the project officer for the F-14A/B Air-to-Ground Weapons Separation Program. In August 1994, he returned to the U.S. Naval Academy as an instructor in the Weapons and Systems Engineering Department.

== NASA career ==
Selected by NASA in December 1994, Curbeam reported to the Johnson Space Center in March 1995. After completing a year of training and evaluation, he was assigned to the Computer Support Branch in the Astronaut Office. He is a veteran of three space flights: STS-85 in 1997, STS-98 in 2001, STS-116 in 2006, and has logged over 901 hours in space, including over 45 hours during three spacewalks.

Between the first two flights, Curbeam was a spacecraft communicator (CAPCOM) responsible for relaying all voice communication between Mission Control and crews aboard the Space Shuttle and International Space Station. After his second flight, he also was the CAPCOM Branch Chief. During the spring of 2002, he was Deputy Associate Administrator for Safety and Mission Assurance, at NASA Headquarters, Washington, D.C.

=== Spaceflight experience ===
STS-85 (August 7–19, 1997) was a 12-day mission during which the crew deployed and retrieved the CRISTA-SPAS payload, operated the Japanese Manipulator Flight Demonstration (MFD) robotic arm, studied changes in the Earth's atmosphere, and tested technology destined for use on the future International Space Station.

STS-98 (February 7–20, 2001) continued the task of building and enhancing the International Space Station by delivering the U.S. laboratory module Destiny. The Shuttle spent seven days docked to the station while Destiny was attached. In helping to complete its assembly, Curbeam logged over 19 EVA hours in 3 space walks.

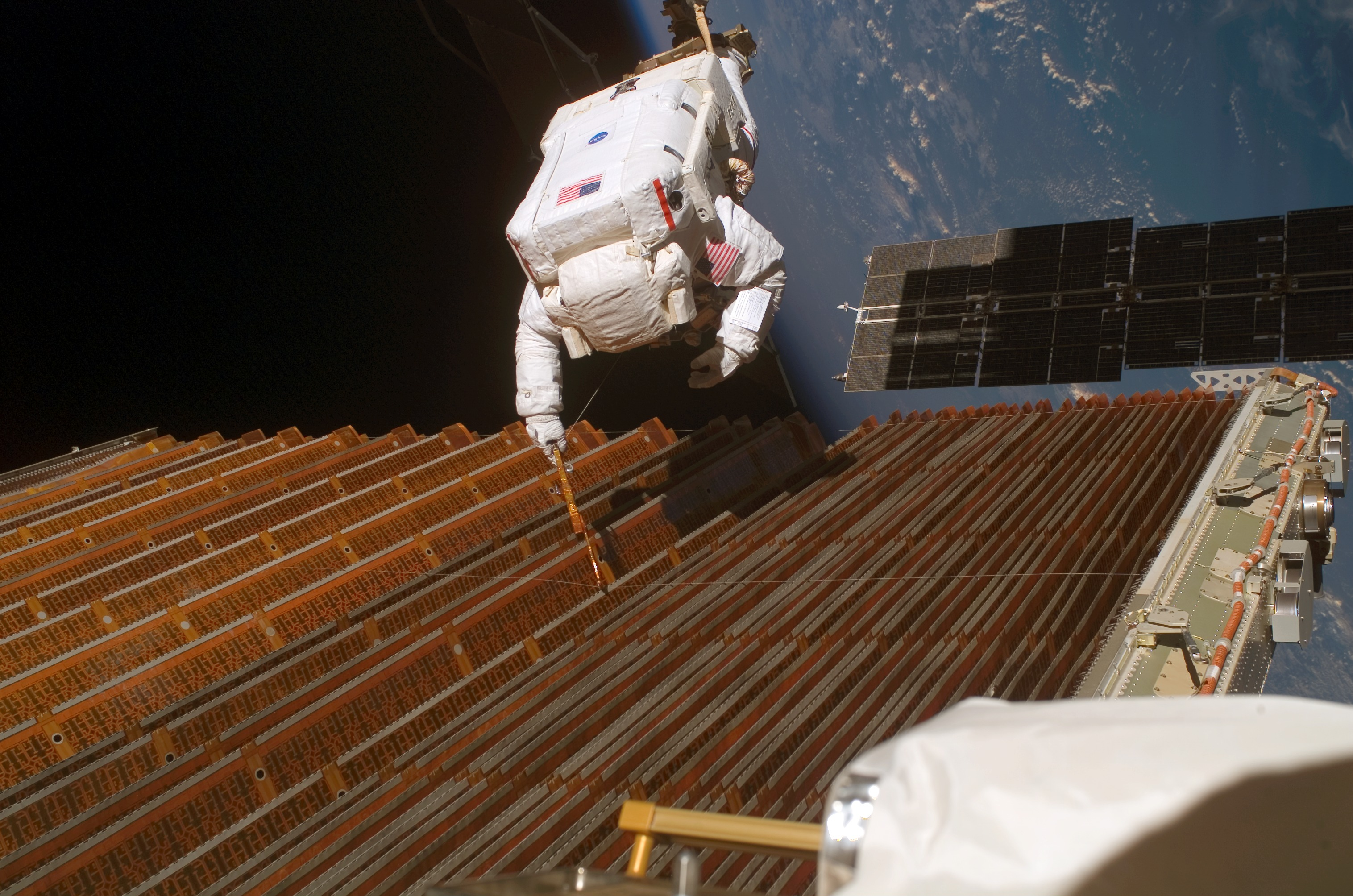
Mission STS-116: Curbeam fixing the solar array wing on the International Space Station's P6 truss during his fourth EVA

STS-116 (December 9–22, 2006) was a mission to the International Space Station. The mission involved the installation of a new truss segment and the rewiring of the station's electrical system. During the mission, Curbeam was the EVA crewmember for the record-breaking four spacewalks, three of which were conducted along with astronaut Christer Fuglesang (Sweden) and one along with astronaut Sunita Williams.

== Post-NASA career ==
On December 7, 2007, NASA announced that Curbeam had chosen to leave NASA after 13 years, to pursue a job in the private sector. He presently works for Astrotech Space Operations as the president and CEO.

Having played lacrosse as a student athlete at the Naval Academy, Curbeam became an assistant coach for the boys lacrosse team at Clear Lake High School in Houston, Texas. In 2011, Curbeam coached Clear Lake to the semifinal match of the Texas High School Lacrosse League South District Championship game.

== See also ==
- List of African-American astronauts
- List of ISS spacewalks
- List of cumulative spacewalk records
