= STS-98 =

2001 American crewed spaceflight to the ISS

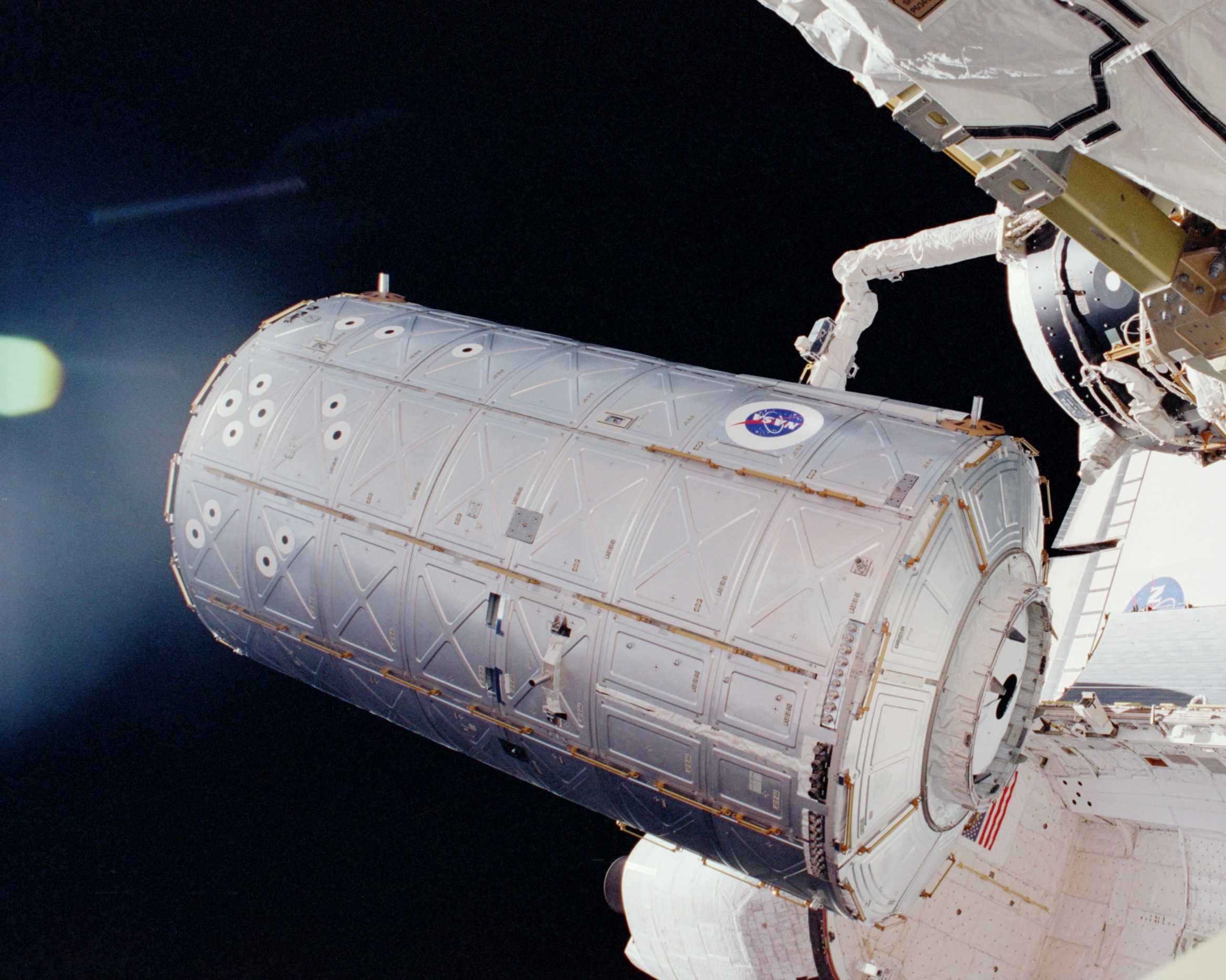
- Atlantis' Canadarm grapples Destiny, prior to the module's installation on the ISS
- Names: Space Transportation System-98
- Mission type: ISS assembly
- Operator: NASA
- COSPAR ID: 2001-006A
- SATCAT no.: 26698
- Mission duration: 12 days, 21 hours, 21 minutes, 0 seconds
- Distance travelled: 8,500,000 kilometers (5,300,000 mi)
- Orbits completed: 171

Spacecraft properties
- Spacecraft: Space Shuttle Atlantis
- Launch mass: 115,529 kilograms (254,698 lb)
- Landing mass: 90,225 kilograms (198,912 lb)
- Payload mass: 14,515 kilograms (32,000 lb)

Crew
- Crew size: 5
- Members: Kenneth D. Cockrell; Mark L. Polansky; Robert L. Curbeam, Jr.; Marsha S. Ivins; Thomas D. Jones

Start of mission
- Launch date: 7 February 2001, 23:13 UTC
- Launch site: Kennedy, LC-39A

End of mission
- Landing date: 20 February 2001, 20:33 UTC
- Landing site: Edwards, Runway 22

Orbital parameters
- Reference system: Geocentric
- Regime: Low Earth
- Perigee altitude: 365 kilometers (197 nmi)
- Apogee altitude: 378 kilometers (204 nmi)
- Inclination: 51.6 degrees
- Period: 92 minutes

Docking with ISS
- Docking port: PMA-3 (Unity nadir)
- Docking date: 9 February 2001, 16:51 UTC
- Undocking date: 16 February 2001, 14:05 UTC
- Time docked: 6 days, 21 hours, 14 minutes
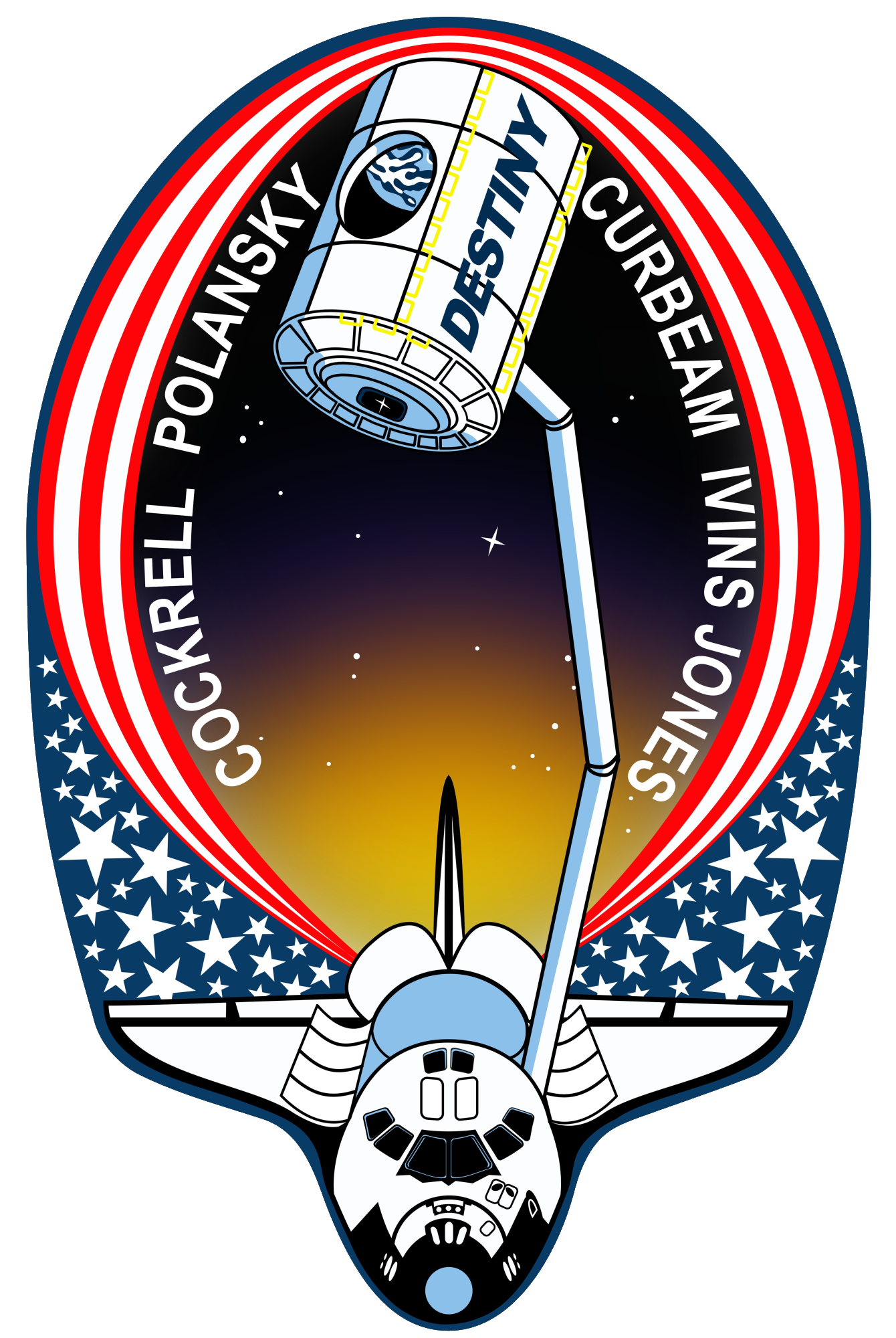
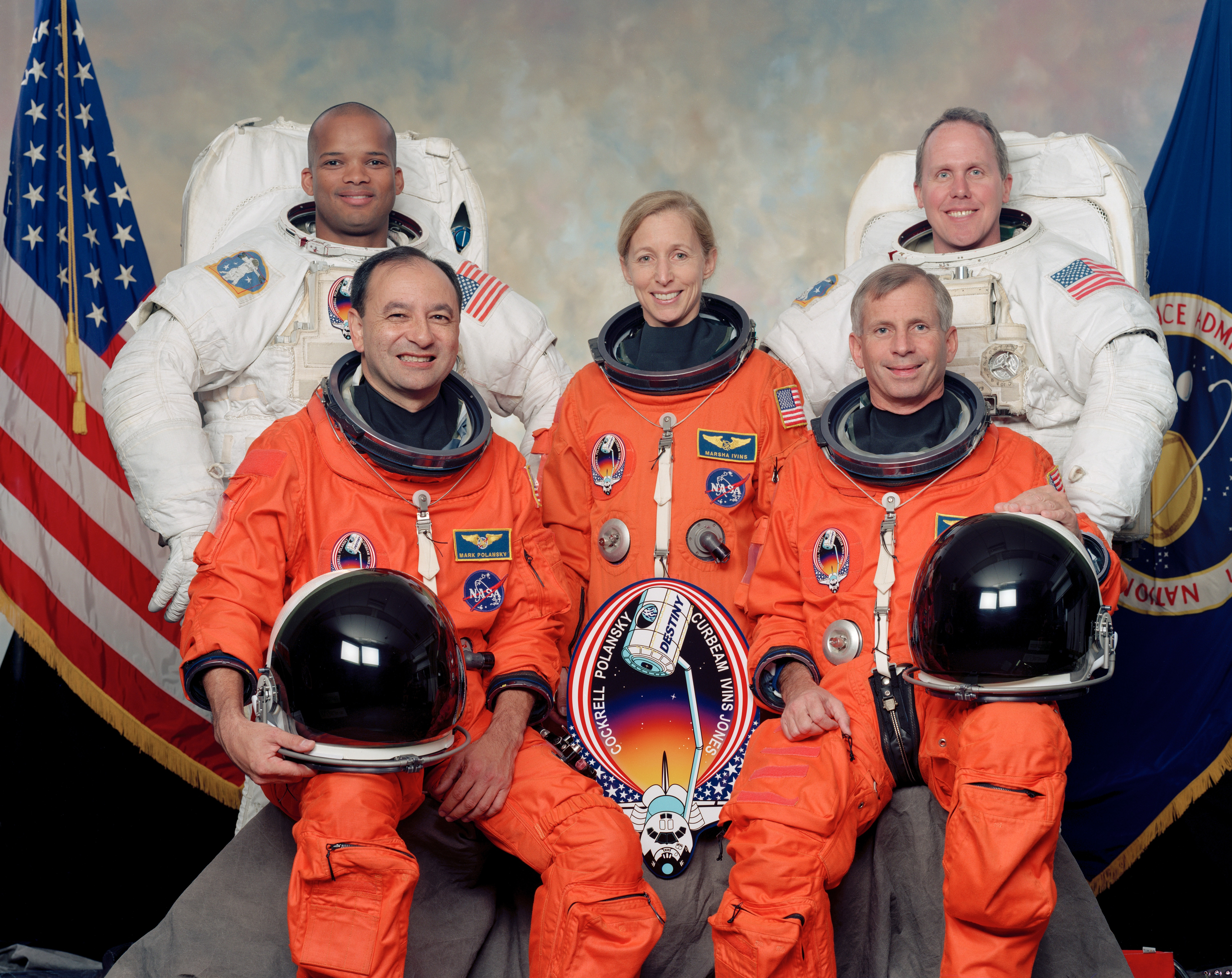
- L-R: Robert Curbeam, Mark Polansky, Marsha Ivins, Kenneth Cockrell and Thomas Jones Space Shuttle program

STS-98 was a 2001 Space Shuttle mission to the International Space Station (ISS) flown by Space Shuttle Atlantis. It was the first human spaceflight launch of the 21st century. STS-98 delivered to the station the Destiny Laboratory Module. All mission objectives were completed and the shuttle reentered and landed safely at Edwards Air Force Base on 20 February 2001, after twelve days in space, six of which were spent docked to the ISS.

== Crew ==
Position	Astronaut
Commander	Kenneth D. Cockrell; Fourth spaceflight
Pilot	Mark L. Polansky; First spaceflight
Mission Specialist 1	Robert L. Curbeam; Second spaceflight
Mission Specialist 2 Flight Engineer	Marsha S. Ivins; Fifth and last spaceflight
Mission Specialist 3	Thomas D. Jones; Fourth and last spaceflight
Mark C. Lee was scheduled to fly as mission specialist 1 on his fifth trip to space, but due to undisclosed reasons, he was removed from this flight. His replacement was Robert Curbeam.

=== Crew seat assignments ===
Seat	Launch	Landing	Seats 1–4 are on the flight deck. Seats 5–7 are on the mid-deck.
1	Cockrell		Seats 1–4 are on the flight deck. Seats 5–7 are on the mid-deck.
2	Polansky		Seats 1–4 are on the flight deck. Seats 5–7 are on the mid-deck.
3	Curbeam	Jones	Seats 1–4 are on the flight deck. Seats 5–7 are on the mid-deck.
4	Ivins		Seats 1–4 are on the flight deck. Seats 5–7 are on the mid-deck.
5	Jones	Curbeam	Seats 1–4 are on the flight deck. Seats 5–7 are on the mid-deck.
6	Unused		Seats 1–4 are on the flight deck. Seats 5–7 are on the mid-deck.
7	Unused		Seats 1–4 are on the flight deck. Seats 5–7 are on the mid-deck.

== Launch attempts ==
Attempt	Planned	Result	Turnaround	Reason	Decision point	Weather go (%)	Notes
1	19 Jan 2001, 2:10:42 am	Scrubbed	—	Technical	15 Jan 2001, 3:00 pm		Rollback to VAB for booster separation cable inspection.
2	7 Feb 2001, 6:11:16 pm	Success	19 days 16 hours 1 minute			90%	

== Mission highlights ==
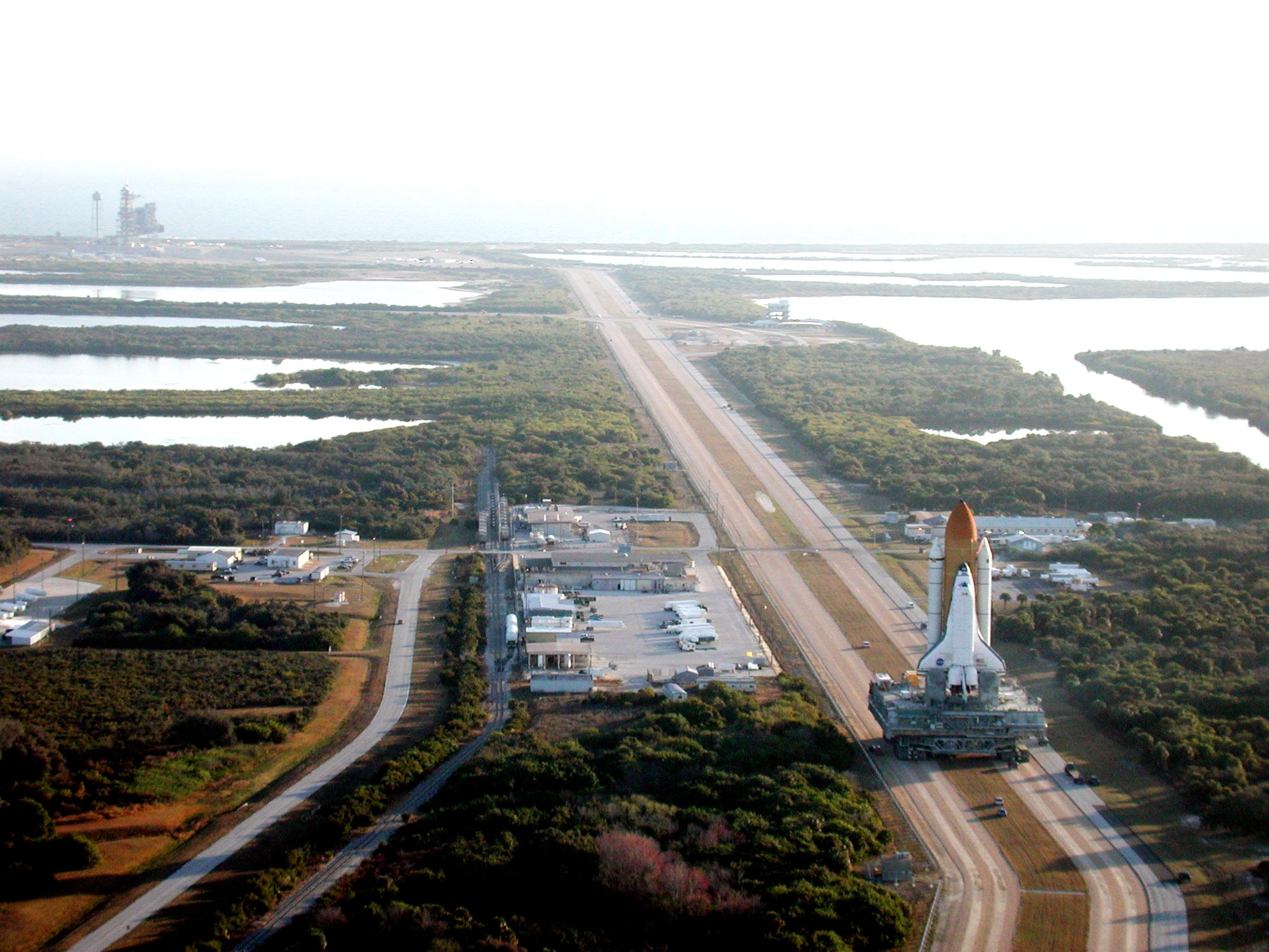
A Crawler-Transporter ferrying Space Shuttle Atlantis to launch pad 39-A for the STS-98 mission.

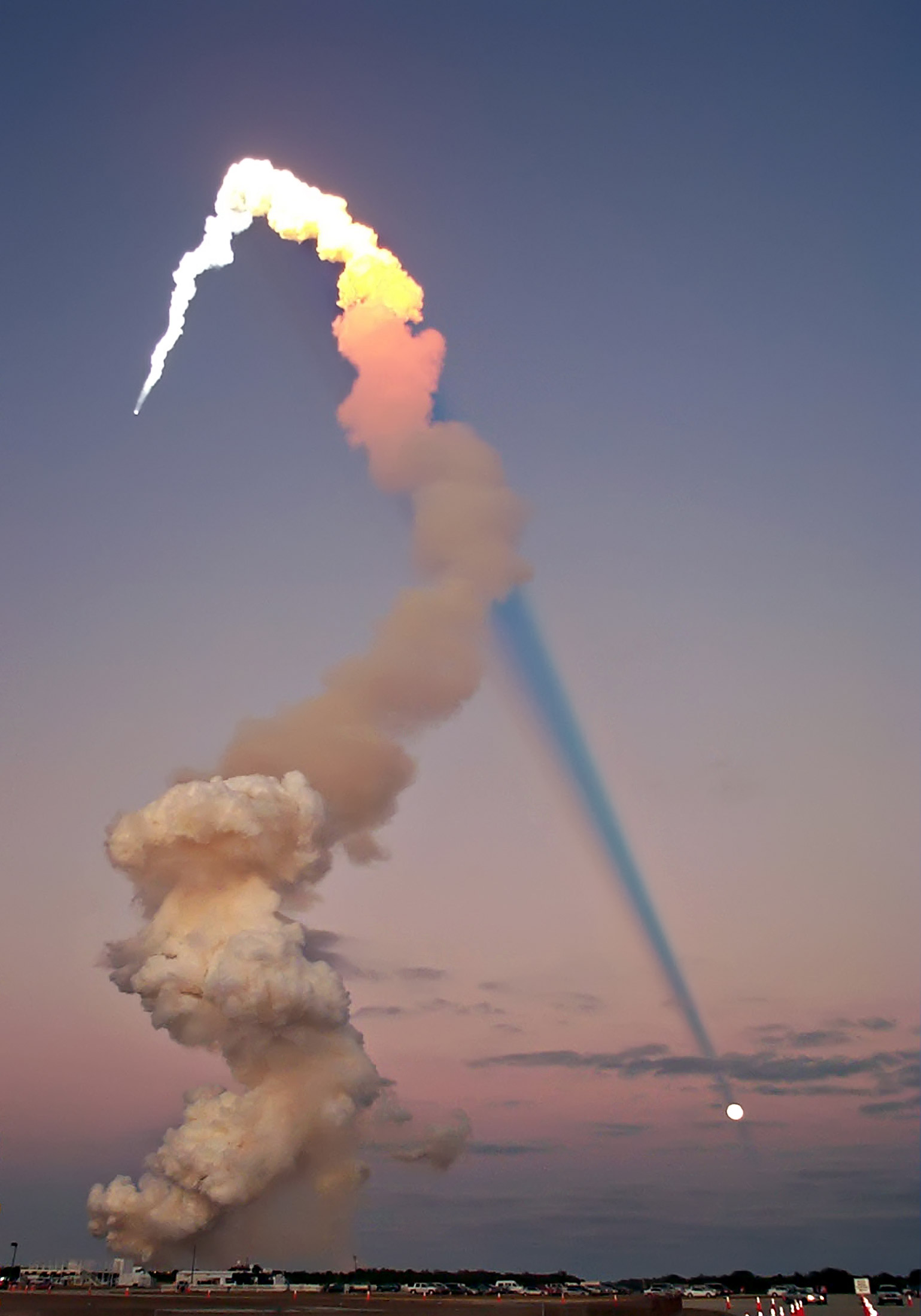
STS-98 following liftoff.

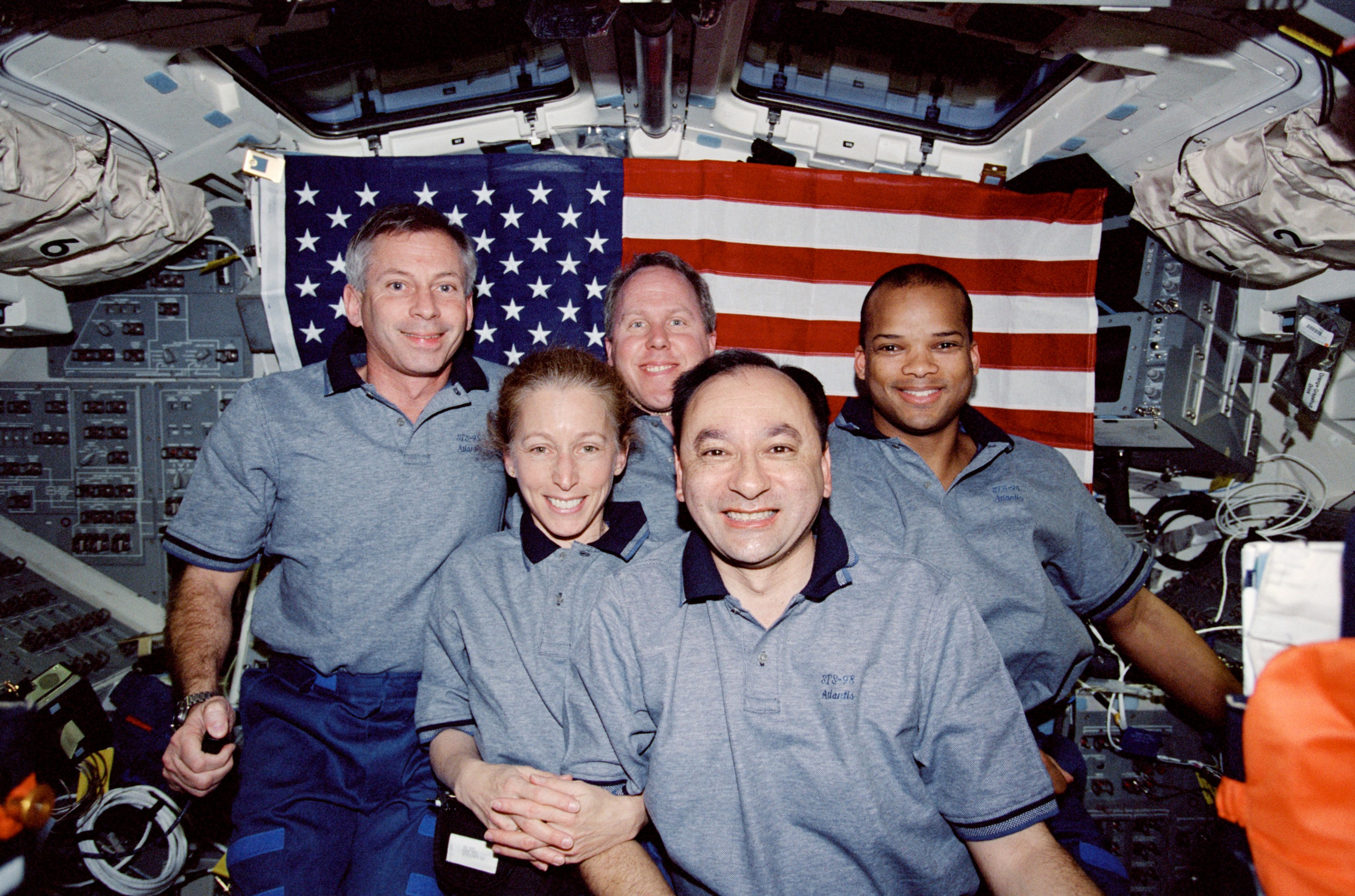
STS-98 crewmembers pose for the traditional inflight portrait on the flight deck of the Space Shuttle Atlantis

The crew continued the task of building and enhancing the International Space Station by delivering the U.S. Destiny Laboratory Module. It was the first NASA lab to be permanently used since the days of Skylab nearly three decades earlier. It was manufactured by Boeing at the Michoud Assembly Facility and the Marshall Space Flight Center in 1997. Upon transport to Kennedy Space Center's industrial buildings, it was fitted with equipment, machines, racks and cables at the Operations and Checkout Building and Space Station Processing Facility. The U.S. laboratory module is 28 feet (8.5 m) long and 14 feet (4.3 m) wide. It is made from aluminum, and comprises three cylindrical sections and two end-cones that contain the hatch openings through which astronauts enter and exit the module. The ends are colored blue and white respectively for the crew to navigate easily. A 20-inch (510 mm)-diameter window is located on one side of the center module segment.

During the mission, the shuttle docked to PMA 3 located on the nadir of Node 1. The crew relocated PMA 2 to the holding area on the Z1 truss temporarily, before using the Shuttle's robotic arm to lift out the 14.5 ton steel module out of the Shuttle's payload bay, and permanently berthed it on the forward hatch of Node 1. Spacewalks conducted by Thomas Jones and Robert Curbeam reattached electrical cables to the aluminum hull and connecting ports on Destiny, and also checked the laboratory's nadir window. PMA 2 was replaced to the forward hatch of Destiny.

The Shuttle spent six days docked to the station while the laboratory was attached and three spacewalks were conducted to complete its assembly. The mission also saw the 100th spacewalk in U.S. spaceflight history. STS-98 occurred while the first station crew was aboard the new space station.

== Space walks ==
EVA	Spacewalkers	Start (UTC)	End	Duration
EVA 1	Thomas D. Jones; Robert L. Curbeam	10 February 2001; 15:50	10 February 2001; 23:24	7 hours 34 minutes
EVA 1	Jones and Curbeam went to the payload bay of Atlantis where they disconnected cables and removed protective covers from the outside hatch of Destiny. Once at the installation site and after Destiny had been securely installed, the pair began connecting power and data cables.			
EVA 2	Jones; Curbeam	12 February 2001; 15:59	12 February 2001; 22:49	6 hours 50 minutes
EVA 2	The pair of spacewalkers went outside and assisted the robot arm operator with removing the Pressurized Mating Adapter 2 (PMA-2) from the Z1 Truss segment and installing it onto the forward end of the Destiny laboratory. Once that task was complete Jones and Curbeam moved to a location on the Destiny lab and installed a Power Data and Grapple fixture and video signal converter, to be used with the Canadarm2.			
EVA 3	Jones; Curbeam	14 February 2001; 14:48	14 February 2001; 20:13	5 hours 25 minutes
EVA 3	During the third and final spacewalk, the two spacewalkers attached a spare communications antenna to the International Space Station's exterior. They also double-checked connections between the Destiny lab and its docking port, released a cooling radiator on the station, inspected solar array connections at the top of the station and tested the ability of a spacewalker to carry an immobile crew member back to the shuttle airlock.			

== Wake-up calls ==
NASA began a tradition of playing music to astronauts during the Gemini program, which was first used to wake up a flight crew during Apollo 15. Each track is specially chosen, often by their families, and usually has a special meaning to an individual member of the crew, or is applicable to their daily activities.

Flight Day	Song	Artist/Composer	Played for	Links
Day 2	"Where You At"	Zoot Sims	Mark Polansky	WAV
Day 3	"Who Let the Dogs Out"	Baha Men	Kenneth Cockrell	WAV
Day 4	"Girl's Breakdown"	Alison Brown	Marsha S. Ivins	WAV
Day 5	"Blue Danube Waltz"	Johann Strauss Jr.		WAV
Day 6	"Fly Me to the Moon"	Frank Sinatra		WAV
Day 7	"For Those About to Rock"	AC/DC		WAV
Day 8	"To the Moon and Back"	Savage Garden		WAV
Day 9	"Sally Ann"	New Grange		WAV
Day 10	"The Trail We Blaze"	Elton John		WAV
Day 11	"Blue (Da Ba Dee)"	Eiffel 65		WAV
Day 12	"Fly Away"	Lenny Kravitz		WAV
Day 13	"Bad To The Bone"	George Thorogood and the Destroyers		WAV
Day 14	"Should I Stay or Should I Go"	The Clash	Entire crew	WAV

== Popular culture and media ==
STS-98 was the designation for the fictional NASA mission to destroy an asteroid in Armageddon (1998 film).

== See also ==
- International Space Station
- List of human spaceflights
- List of International Space Station spacewalks
- List of Space Shuttle missions
- List of spacewalks and moonwalks 1965–1999
- Outline of space science
