= Destiny (ISS module) =

Primary US ISS module

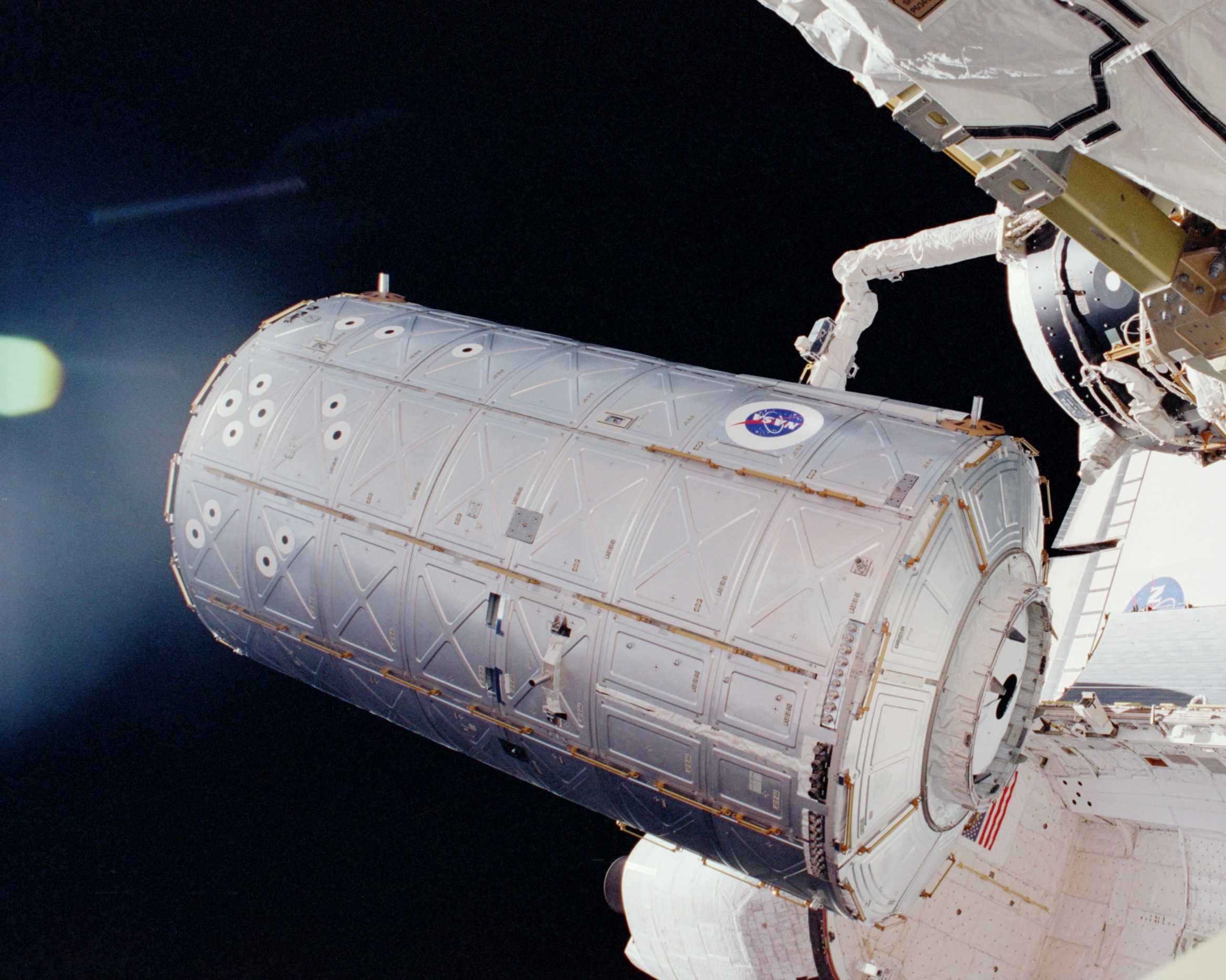
- The Destiny Laboratory Module (NASA) being installed on the International Space Station.

Module statistics
- COSPAR ID: 2001-006B
- Launch date: February 7, 2001
- Launch vehicle: Space Shuttle Atlantis (STS-98)
- Berthed: February 10, 2001
- Mass: 14,515 kg (32,000 lb)
- Length: 8.5 m (28 ft)
- Diameter: 4.3 m (14 ft)
- Pressurized volume: 104.77 m^{3} (3,700 cu ft)

The Destiny module, also known as the U.S. Lab, is the primary operating facility for U.S. research payloads aboard the International Space Station (ISS). It was berthed to the forward port of the Unity module and activated over a period of five days in February 2001. Destiny is NASA's first permanent operating orbital research station since Skylab was vacated in February 1974.

The Boeing Company began construction of the 14,515-kilogram (32,000 lb) research laboratory in 1995 at the Michoud Assembly Facility and then the Marshall Space Flight Center in Huntsville, Alabama. Destiny was shipped to the Kennedy Space Center in Florida in 1998, and was turned over to NASA for pre-launch preparations in August 2000. It launched on February 7, 2001, aboard the Space Shuttle Atlantis on STS-98.

Astronauts work inside the pressurized facility to conduct research in numerous scientific fields. Scientists throughout the world would use the results to enhance their studies in medicine, engineering, biotechnology, physics, materials science, and Earth science.

== Launch and installation ==
Mission patch for STS-98

Destiny was launched to ISS aboard the Space Shuttle mission STS-98. It launched into Earth orbit on February 7, 2001, aboard the Space Shuttle Atlantis. On February 10, 2001, at 9:50 am CST, the installation of Destiny began. First, the Shuttle SRMSS (Canadarm) was used to remove Pressurized Mating Adapter 2 (PMA 2) from Unity node's forward port to make room for the new module. PMA-2 was temporarily stowed on the forward berthing ring of the Z1 truss. Destiny was "grabbed" by the robotic arm at 11:23, lifted out of Atlantis' cargo bay, and berthed to the forward port of Unity. Two days later, PMA-2 was moved to its semi-permanent location on the forward port of Destiny. Several years later, on November 14, 2007, the Harmony module was attached to the forward port of the Destiny laboratory, and PMA 2 was again relocated to the forward port of Harmony.

The addition of Destiny increased the habitable volume by 3,800 cubic feet, an increase of 41 percent.

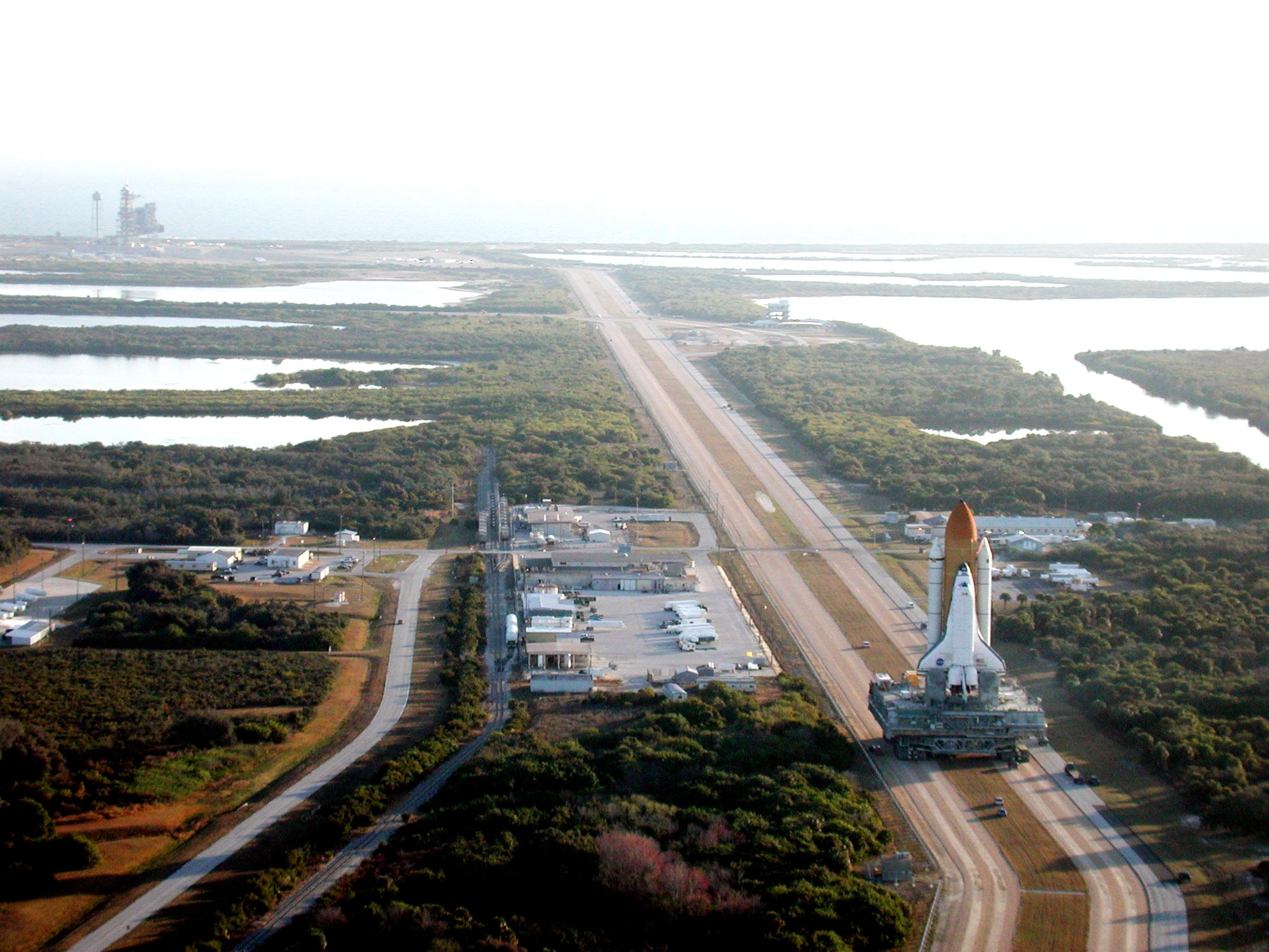
Atlantis with Destiny in its cargo bay heads to the launch pad

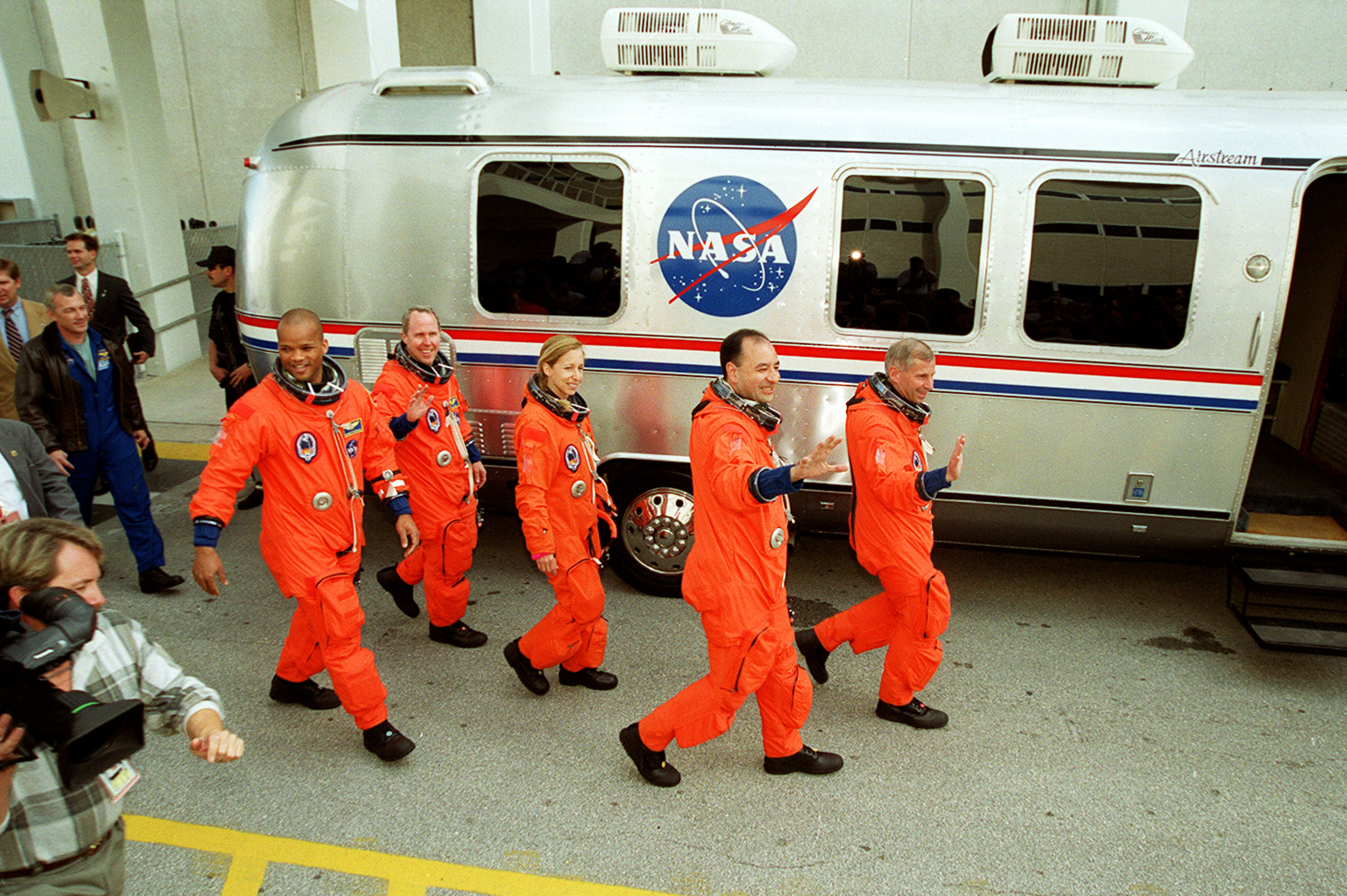
The Shuttle crew heading out for the launch

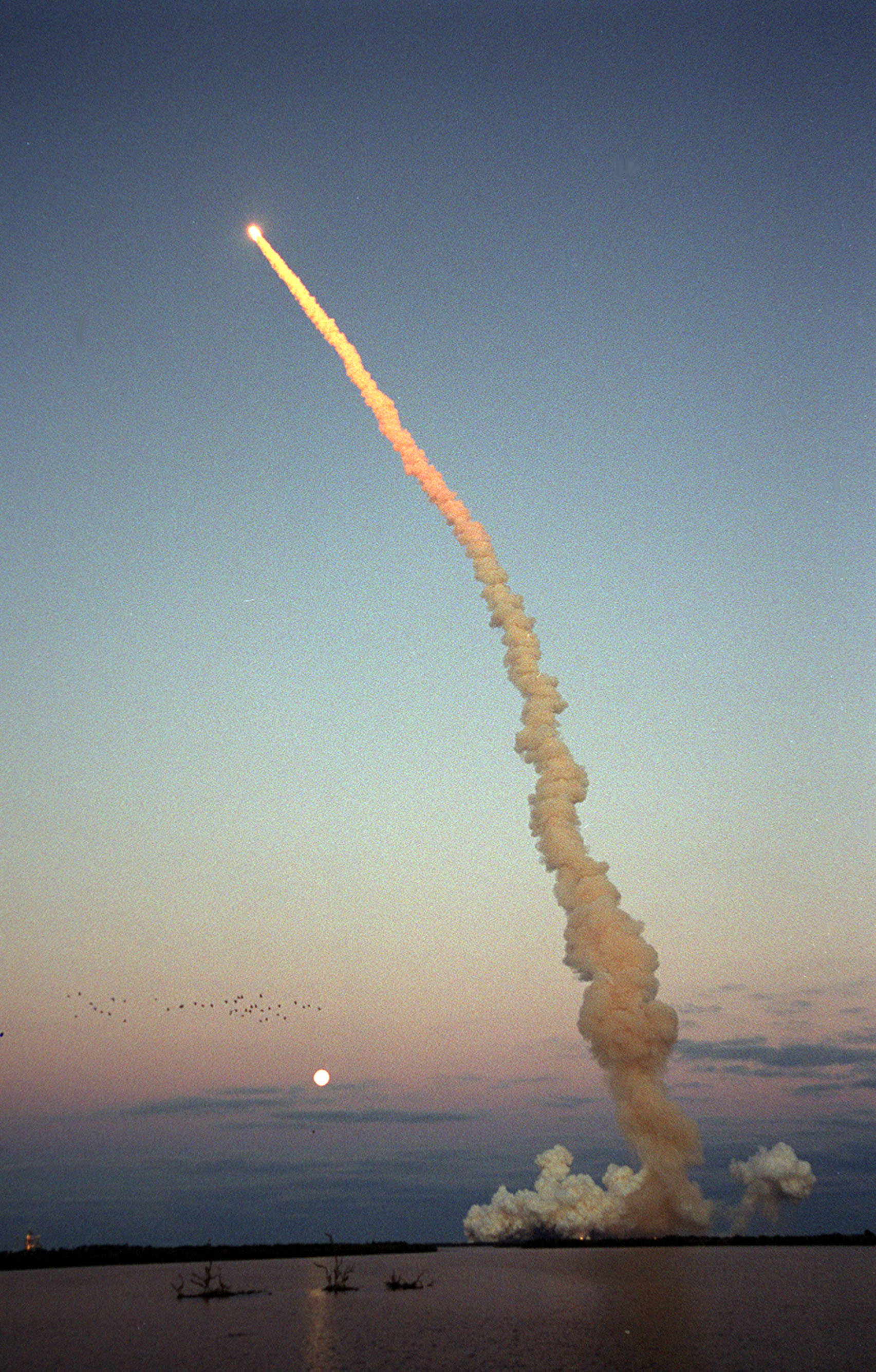
Liftoff

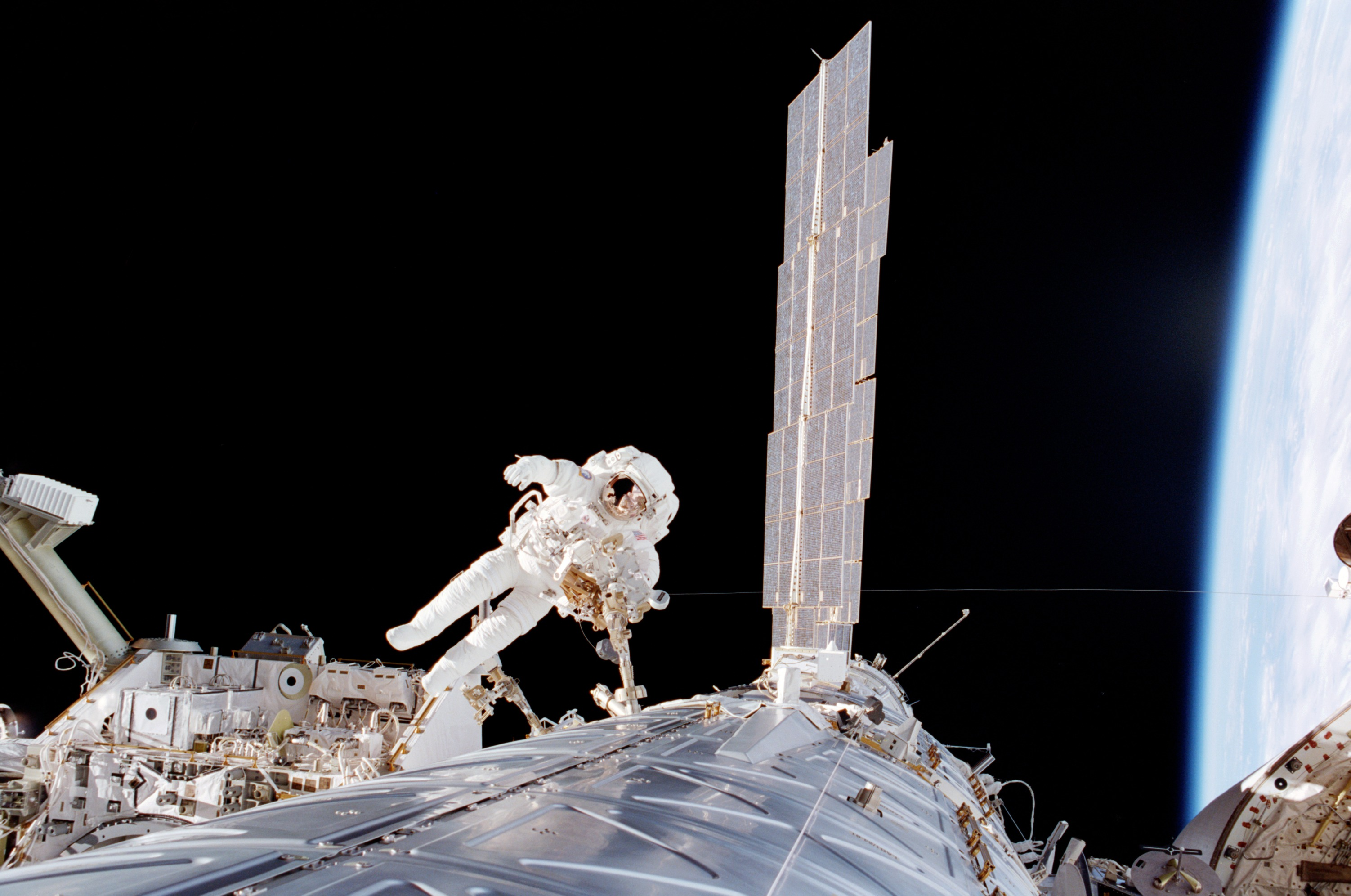
Astronaut on EVA with Destiny

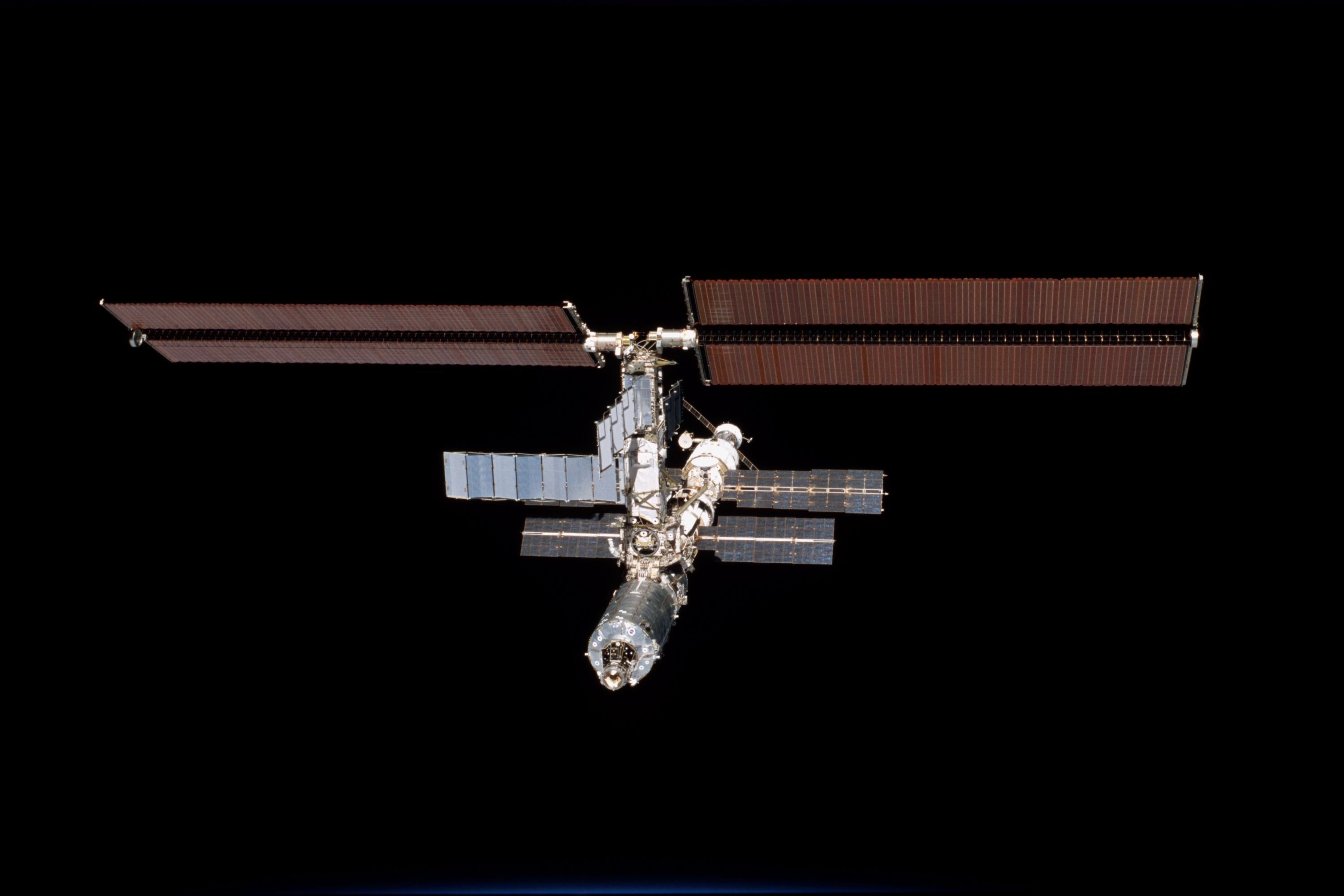
The newly expanded ISS with Destiny Laboratory, February 2001

== Laboratory structure ==
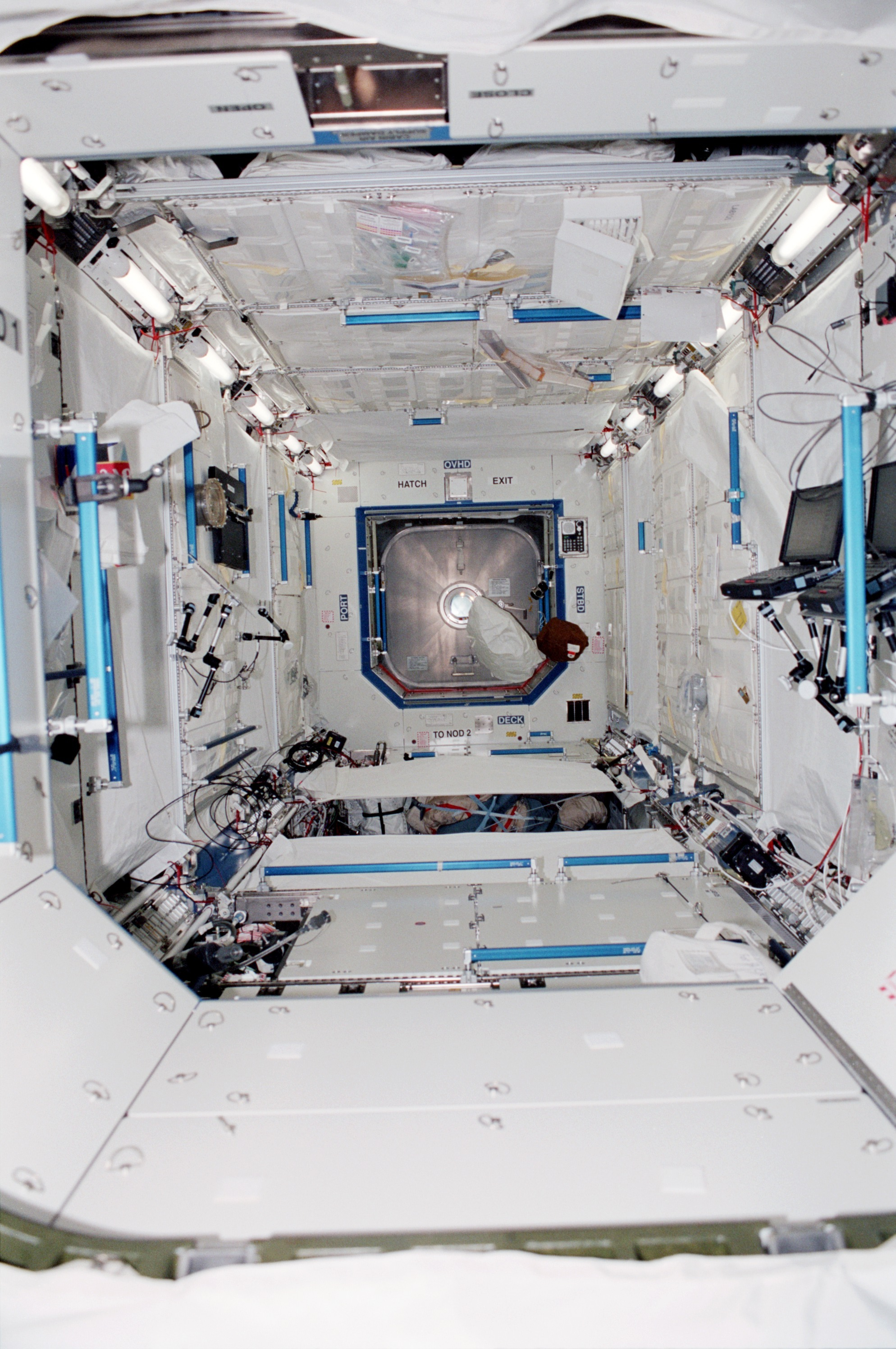
The Destiny laboratory as it looked following installation in 2001.

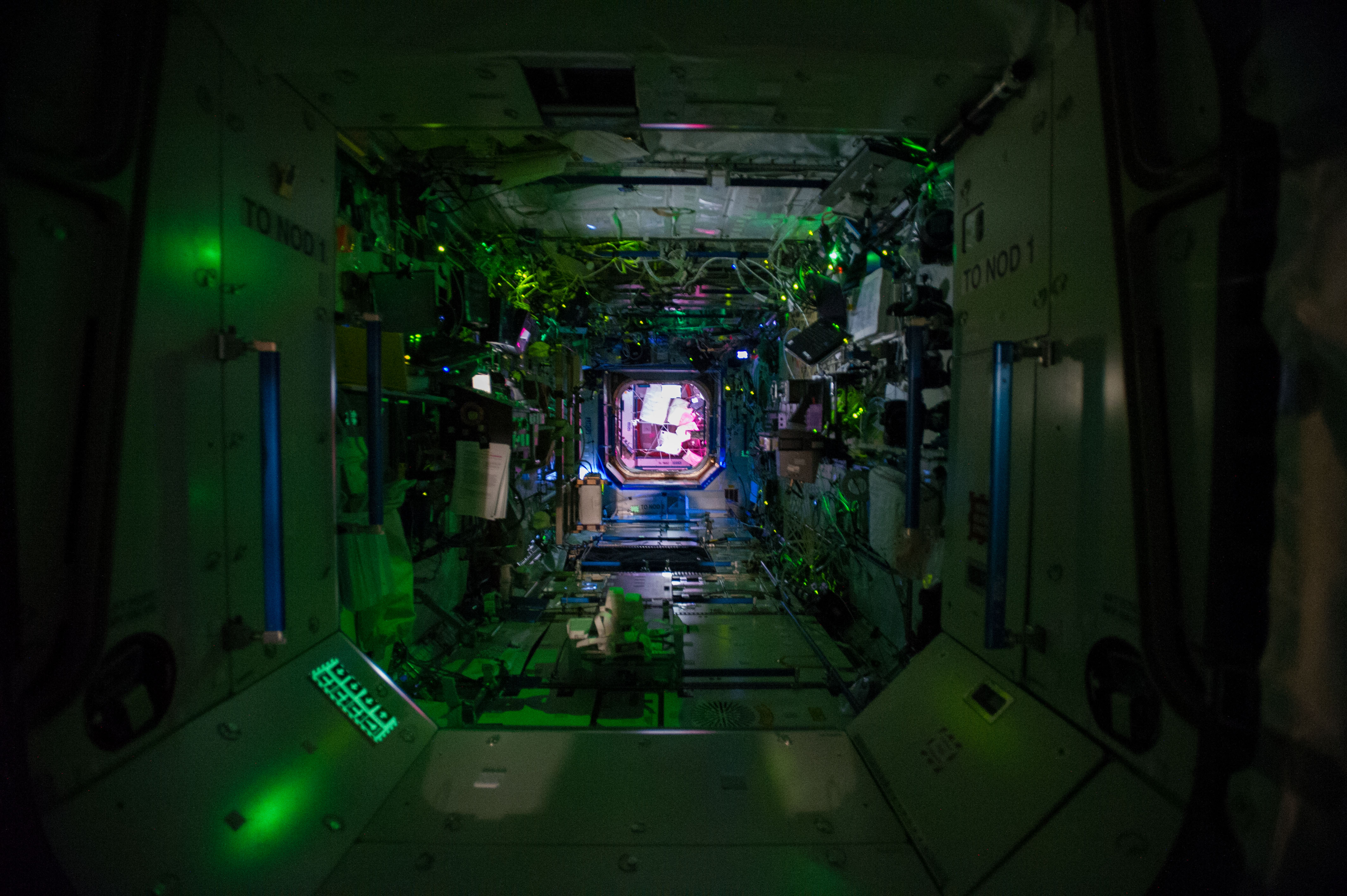
Interior view of the US lab with the lights turned off, i.e. while the crew sleeps

The U.S. laboratory module is 28 feet (8.5 m) long and 14 feet (4.3 m) wide. It is made from aluminum, and comprises three cylindrical sections and two endcones that contain the hatch openings through which astronauts enter and exit the module. The aft port of Destiny is connected to the forward port of Unity, and the forward port of Destiny is connected to the aft port of Harmony. The ends are colored blue and white respectively for the crew to navigate easily. A 20-inch (510 mm)-diameter window is located on one side of the center module segment.

Each of the two berthing ports on Destiny contains a hatch. Both hatches are normally open, and remain open unless a situation arises requiring a module to be isolated. Each hatch has a window. The hatches can be opened or closed from either side. The hatches have a pressure interlock feature, which prevents the hatch from being opened if there is a negative pressure across the hatch (higher pressure on the outside of the hatch). The hatch openings are a square-like six sided shape - which is associated to that module.

Destiny has a 20-inch (510 mm) optically pure, telescope-quality glass window located in an open rack bay used primarily for Earth science observations. Station crewmembers use very high quality video and still cameras at the window to record Earth's changing landscapes. A window shutter protects the window from potential micrometeoroid and orbital debris strikes during the life of the ISS. The crew manually opens the shutter to use the window.

Imagery captured from Destiny's window has given geologists and meteorologists the chance to study floods, avalanches, fires and ocean events such as plankton blooms in a way never seen before, as well as given international scientists the opportunity to study features such as glaciers, coral reefs, urban growth and wild fires.

=== Specifications ===
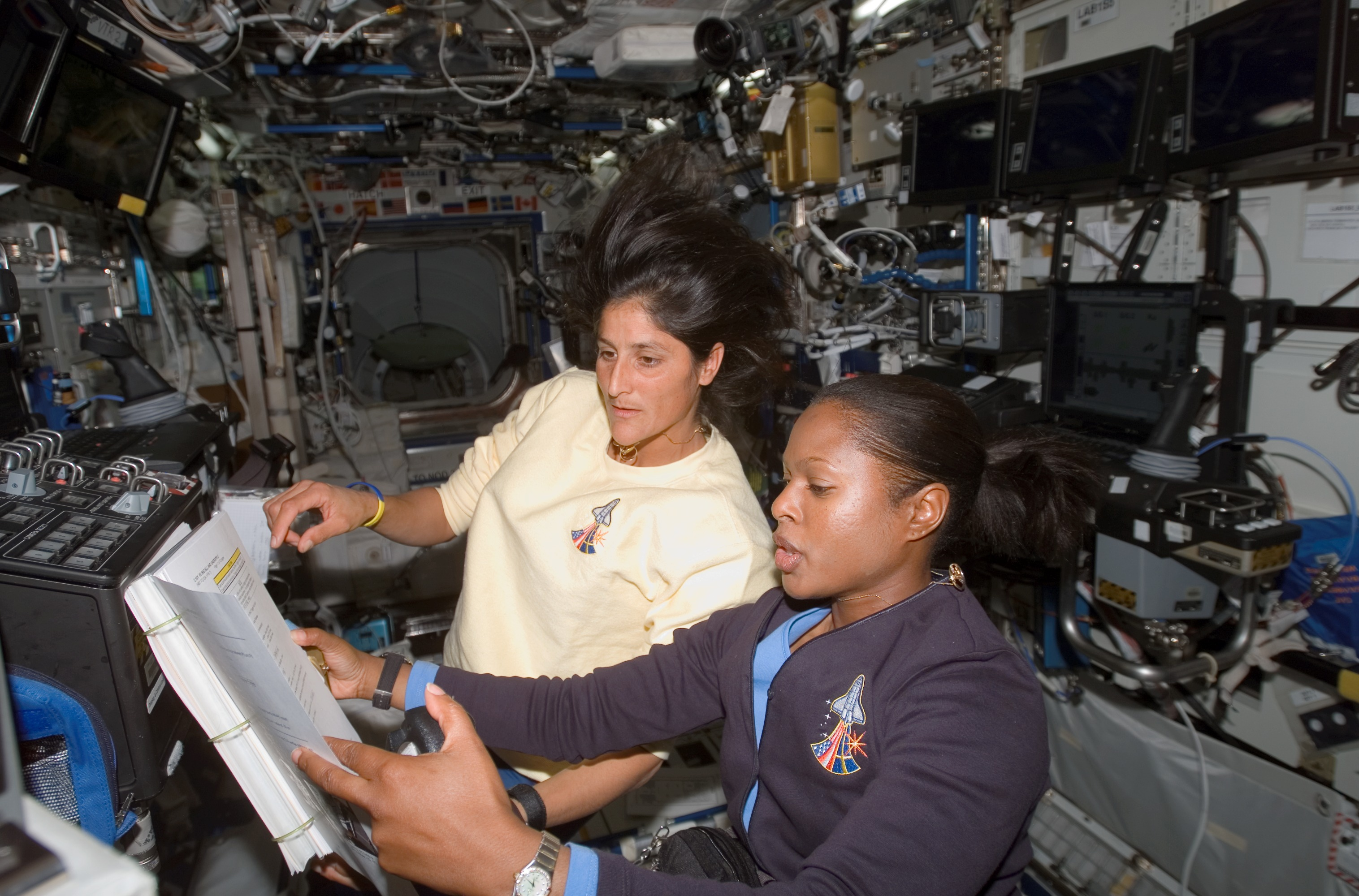
Joan E. Higginbotham and Sunita L. Williams work the controls of the Space Station Remote Manipulator System in the Destiny laboratory.

- Length: 8.53 metres (28.0 ft)
- Diameter: 4.27 metres (14.0 ft)
- Mass: 14,520 kilograms (32,010 lb)
- Pressurized Volume: 106 cubic metres (3,700 cu ft)

== Equipment ==
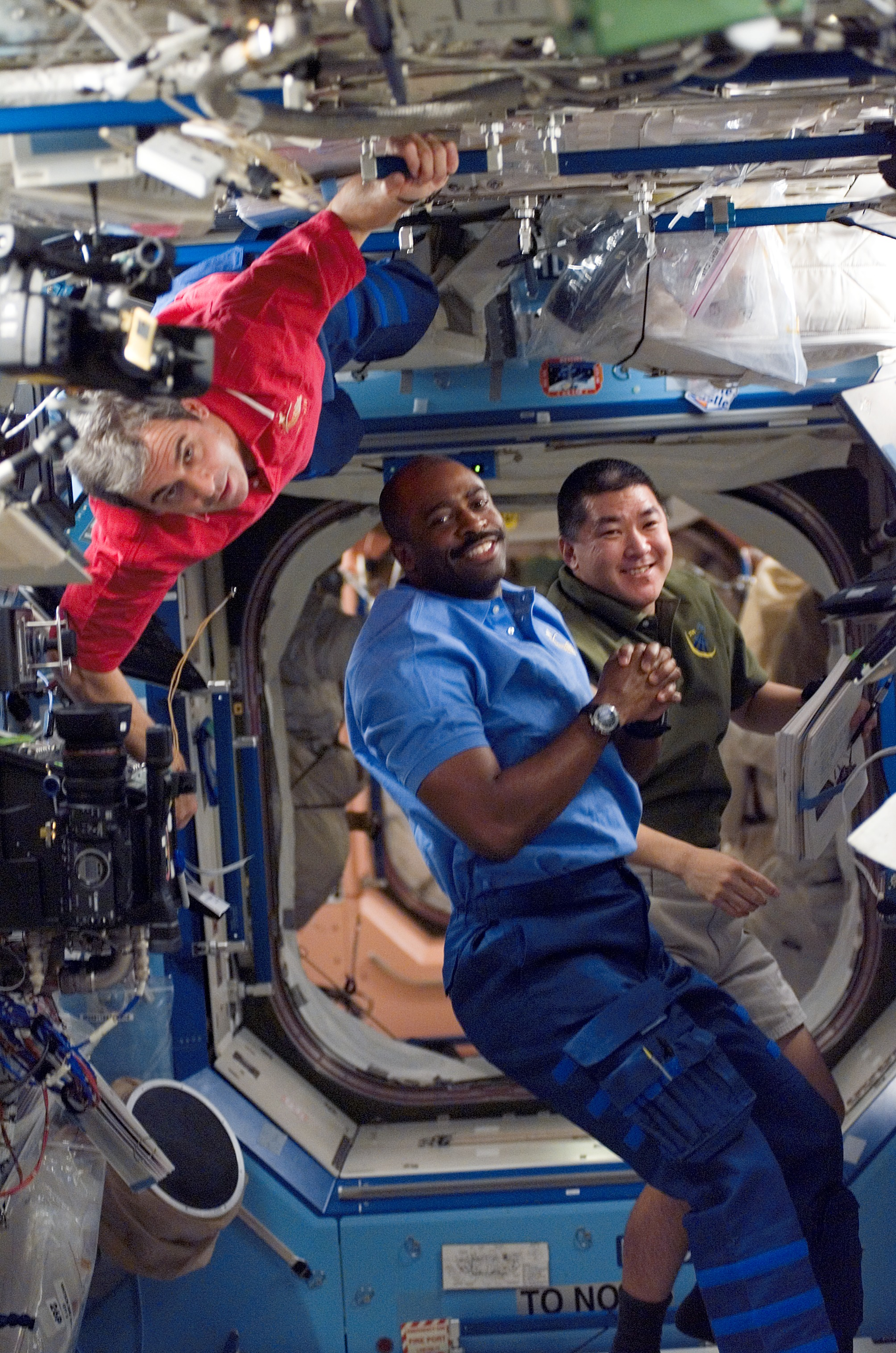
Leland D. Melvin and STS-122 mission specialists working on robotic equipment in the US lab

As with the European and Japanese laboratories of the station, payloads inside Destiny are configured around International Standard Payload Racks (ISPRs), that can be removed or reconfigured for various experiments and equipment. Made out of a graphite composite shell, each rack weighs about 1,200 pounds (540 kg), and is about 73 inches (1,900 mm) high, and 42 inches (1,100 mm) wide. The eight rack bays are equipped with curtains that provide around 290 cubic feet (8.2 m^{3}) of temporary stowage space when not occupied by experiments.

Destiny arrived at the station pre-configured with five racks housing electrical and life support systems that provide electrical power, cooling water, air revitalization, and temperature and humidity control. Seven additional racks were flown to Destiny in the Leonardo Multi-Purpose Logistics Module by STS-102, and ten more were delivered on subsequent missions. Destiny can hold up to 13 payload racks with experiments in human life science, materials research, Earth observations and commercial applications. The laboratory has a total of 24 racks inside the laboratory, six on each side.

Internal to the laboratory are racks, rack stand-offs, and vestibule jumpers. The lab racks house the system hardware in removable modular units. The stand-offs provide space for electrical connections, data management systems cabling for computers, air conditioning ducts, thermal control tubes and more, all of which support the space station's equipment racks. The racks interface to the piping and wiring in the standoff via outlets and ports located in the standoffs at the base end of each rack location.

Jumpers in the vestibule, the area between Unity and Destiny, connect the piping and wiring between the two. Grounding straps are installed between Unity and Destiny. One side of the grounding strap is connected to the Active Common Berthing Mechanism (ACBM) on Unity, while the other end is connected to the Passive Common Berthing Mechanism (PCBM) on Destiny.

Some of the mechanisms on Destiny are the CBMs (passive and active), hatches, and the laboratory window shutter. The ACBM is in the forward port of the laboratory. It is attached to the Harmony node. The PCBM on Destiny is located in the laboratory's aft port. The ACBM in Unity's forward port is latched to the laboratory's PCBM to berth Destiny to Unity.

=== Science equipment ===
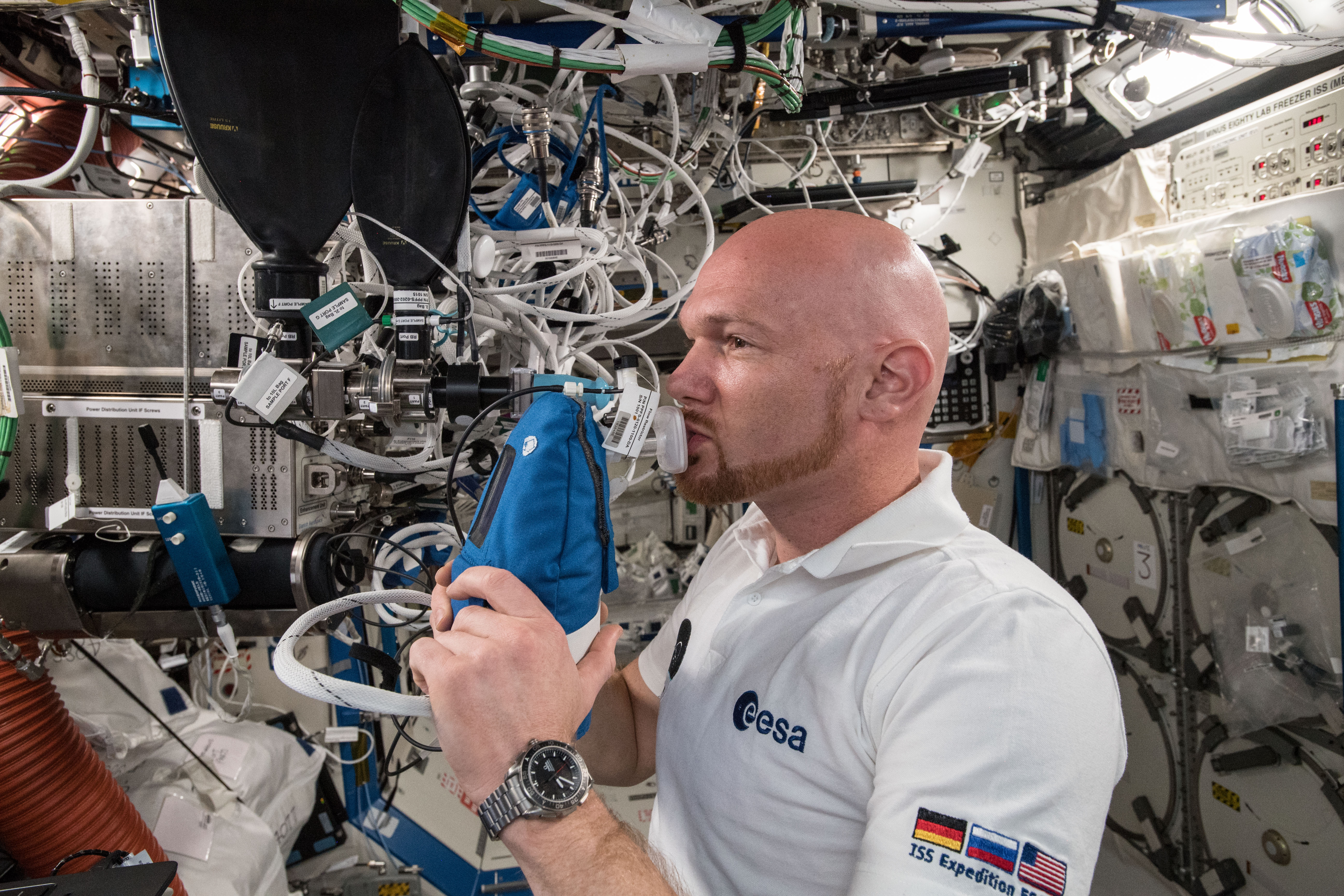
Alexander Gerst works in the Destiny module

Destiny also contains the Minus Eighty Degree Laboratory Freezer for ISS (MELFI), transported to the Space Station on STS-121. The freezer is used both to store samples and reagents on the station, and to transport them to and from the space station in a temperature controlled environment.

Currently installed at the main observation window of Destiny is the Agricultural Camera (AgCam). It is a multi-spectral imaging system built and primarily operated by students and faculty at the University of North Dakota. Its purpose is to take frequent images, in visible and infrared light, of vegetated areas on the Earth and promises to deliver a greater effectiveness for in-season agriculture applications research and operational decision support than current satellite systems such as Landsat.

== Veggie ==
In 2016 the ISS crew operated Veg-03 experiment. In November they harvested a crop of edible romaine lettuce which contributed to the crew's meal. Also samples of cabbage are returned to Earth for testing as part of the experiment. This uses the Veggie experiment module in Destiny, which can provide light and nutrients for plant growth experiments.

== Destiny nadir window ==
The nadir window is formally known as the U.S. Laboratory Science Window, has the "...highest quality optics ever flown on a human occupied spacecraft...", according to NASA, and can support taking Earth observations/images. In 2010 a research facility was brought to the station, called WORF, and the first photo with it was taken in January 2011. WORF was delivered by ISS Flight 19A (which was STS-131) .

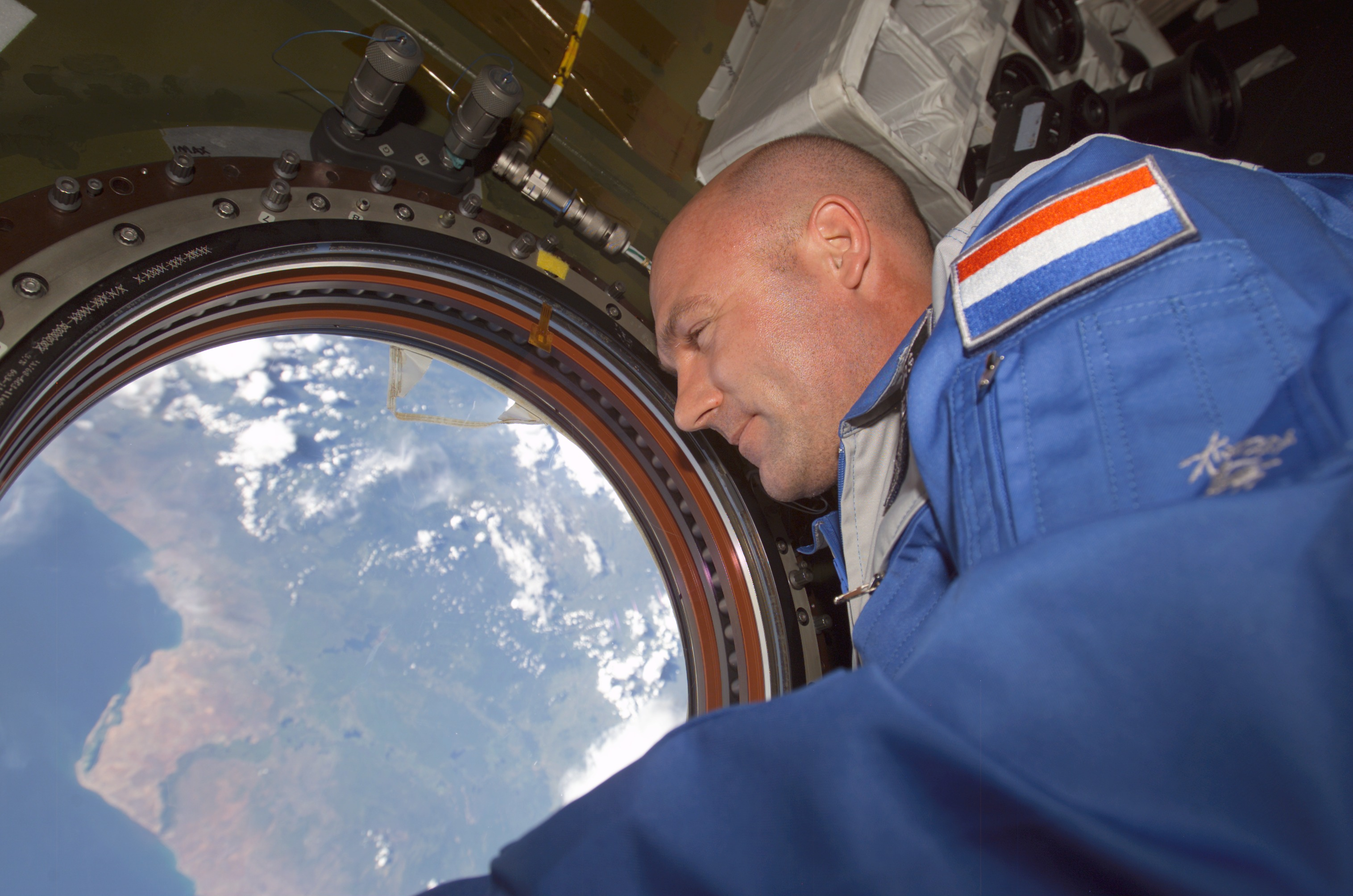
Dutch ESA astronaut André Kuipers looks out of the Destiny nadir window at Earth

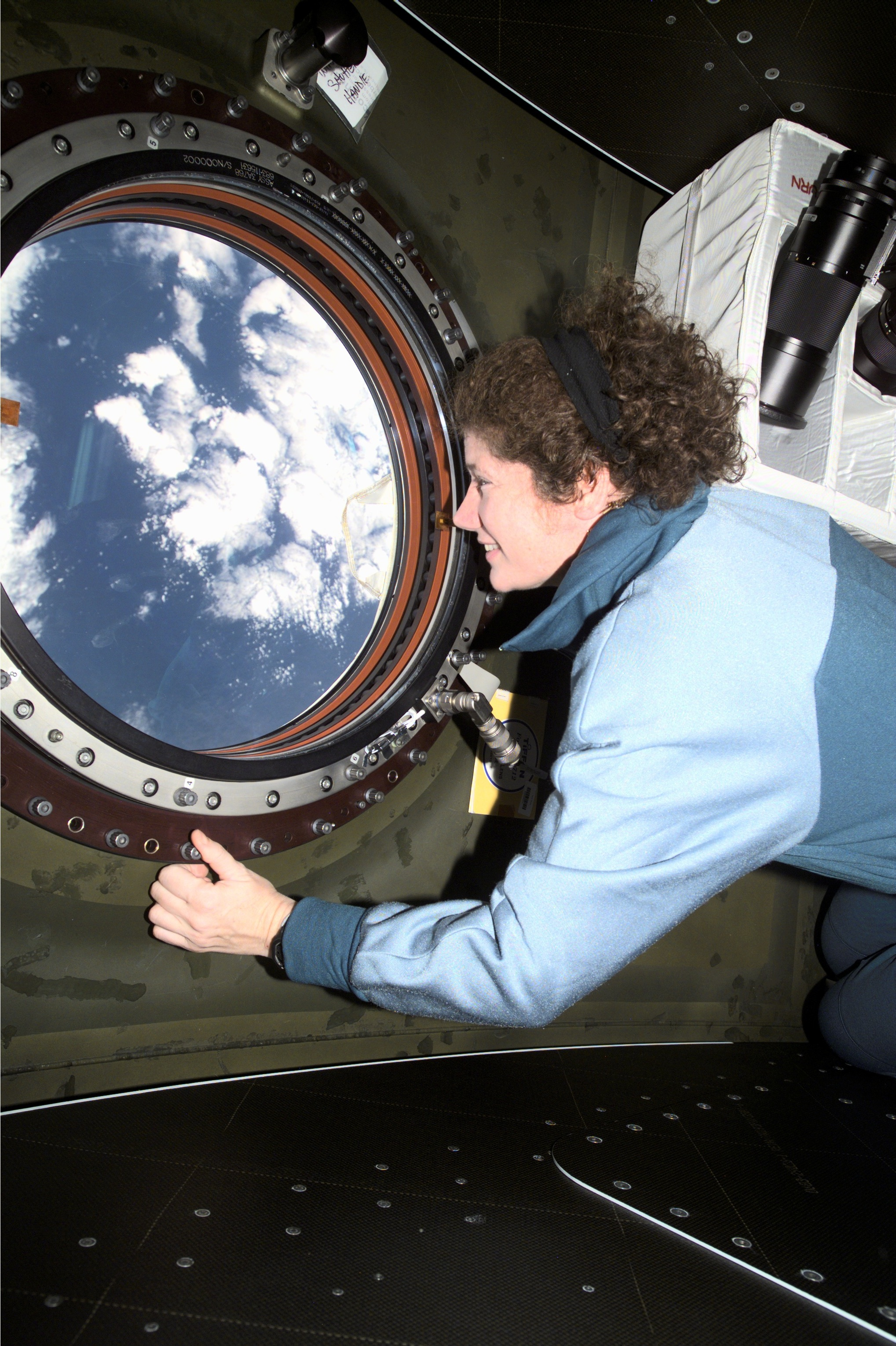
Astronaut Susan Helms looks out the nadir window, 2001

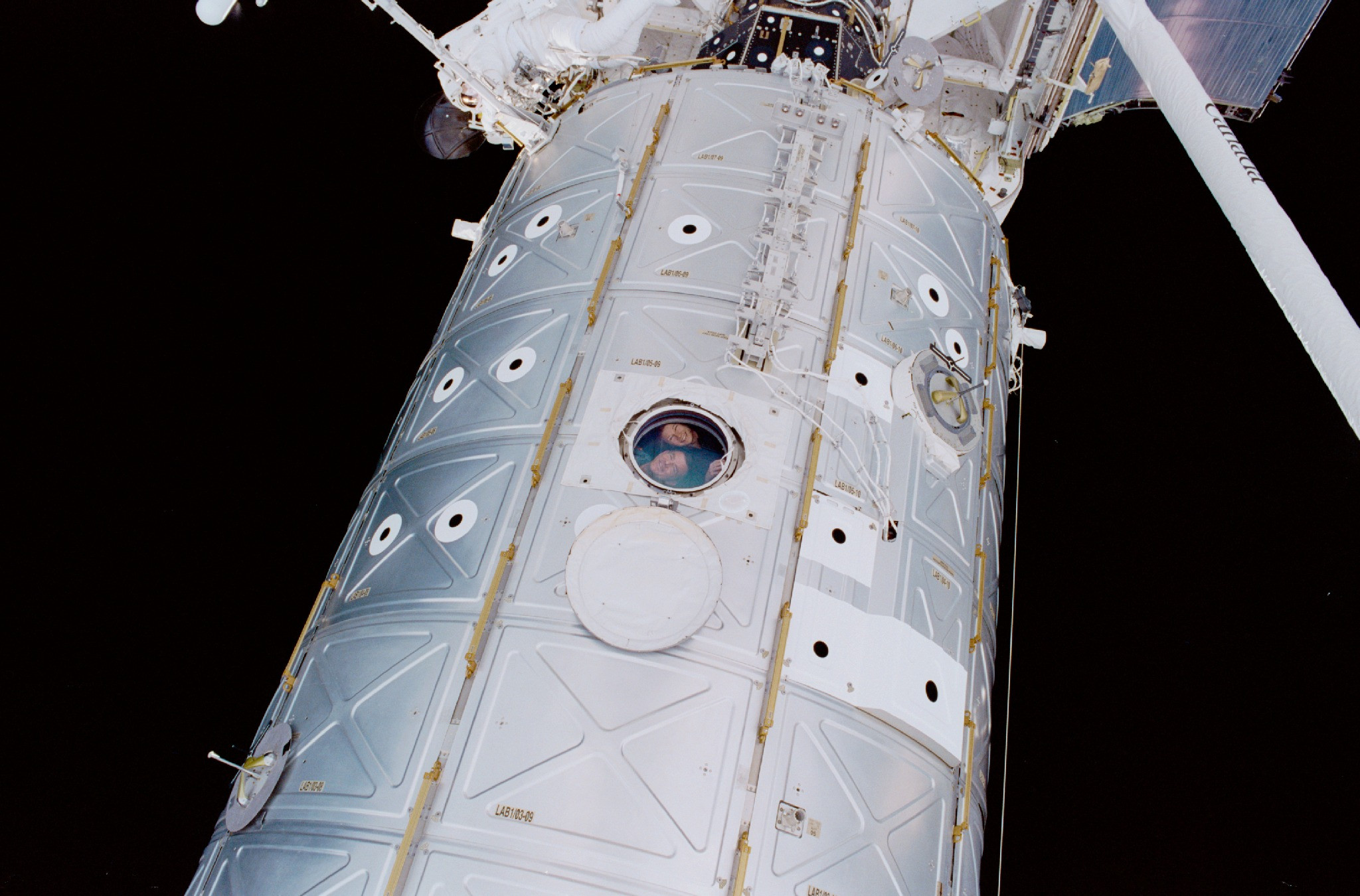
Destiny nadir view with astronauts Susan J. Helms and James S. Voss looking out

=== WORF ===
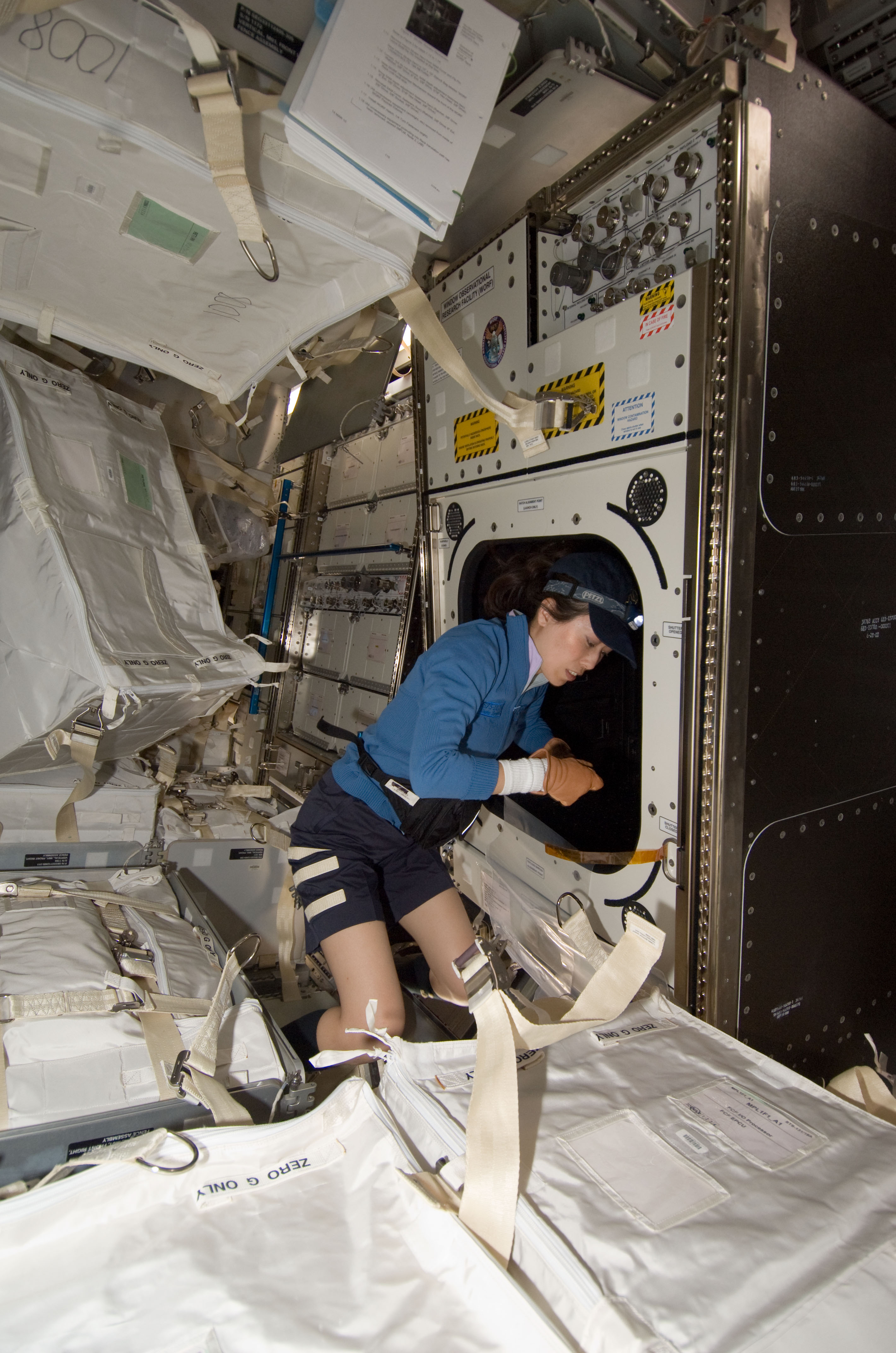
Naoko Yamazaki installing Window Observational Research Facility

In 2010 the WORF was brought to ISS aboard STS-131 and installed. This is a facility that uses the Destiny nadir window to support various types of photography and observation. WORF, which stands for Window Observational Research Facility is constructed based on International Standard Payload Rack (ISPR) and EXPRESS Rack program technology. The first photo taken by WORF was on January 21, 2011, with Ag Cam.

The name WORF is an allusion to Worf, the fictional character of the same name who appeared in the science fiction television and film franchise Star Trek. A special mission patch for WORF was issued that featured text written in the Klingon language. Another cross-over of the Star Trek franchise and space exploration was the naming of Space Shuttle Enterprise.

A similar window is Nauka module's porthole window.

== In media ==
- The module Destiny is featured in the 2013 film Gravity.
- The module, identified as "the 2001 module Destiny", was originally intended to be the small section of Alpha (the future name of the ISS) used as a throne at the end of the 2017 film Valerian and the City of a Thousand Planets and covers this role in the novelization, but, in the final shooting of the film, it was replaced by the Apollo command and service module Destiny 2005, modified with artificial gravity and a speakerphone-like radio system.

== See also ==
After its installation, habitation and use of Destiny is similar to ISS history as an integrated part of that Space station:

- List of ISS Expeditions
- List of International Space Station crew
- List of International Space Station visitors
- List of human spaceflights to the ISS
