= AgCam =

The AgCam is a ruggedized camera system developed for use on Agricultural equipment to assist in viewing on large machinery. The system is manufactured by Dakota Micro, Inc., a North Dakota Corporation, United States.

The University of North Dakota has developed a camera for use on the International Space Stations that was named the AgCam, but has since changed the name of their camera to ISSAC in the light of copyright issues.

The AgCam is sold to a network of equipment dealerships. AgCam is sold by OEM Companies, including: AGCO Corporation, Trimble, Pickett Equipment, Morris Industries Ltd., Double L Inc. and TOPCON,
