= Oru =

ORU, Oru or Õru can refer to:

- Orbital replacement unit, used on the International Space Station
- Orbital replacement unit (HST), used on the Hubble Space Telescope
- Oral Roberts University, a university in south Tulsa, Oklahoma
- Orange & Rockland Utilities, a subsidiary of Consolidated Edison in New York
- Otago Rugby Union
- Oru, polite Japanese verb- see keigo
- Observational Results (Unsolicited), a message type of the Health Level 7 standard.
- Funda Oru (born 1985), Belgian politician
- Juan Mendoza Airport, with IATA code ORU

== Places in Estonia ==
- Oru, Kohtla-Järve, an exclave district of Kohtla-Järve
- Oru, Lääne County, village in Lääne-Nigula Parish, Lääne County
- Oru, Lääne-Viru County, village in Viru-Nigula Parish, Lääne-Viru County
- Oru, Harju County, village in Kose Parish, Harju County
- Õru, small borough in Valga Parish, Valga County
- Oru Palace, former presidential residence in Toila, Ida-Viru County
- Oru Parish, former municipality in Lääne County
- Õru Parish, former municipality in Valga County
