= LDU =

LDU may refer to:

== Politics ==
- Alliance of Independents (German: Landesring der Unabhängigen), a 1936–1999 political party in Switzerland
- Lahu Democratic Union, a political and insurgent group in Myanmar
- Liberal and Democratic Union, a 1906–1910 South Australian political party
- National Self-Government of Germans in Hungary (German: Landesselbstverwaltung der Ungarndeutschen)

== Science and mathematics ==
- Land disposal unit, a term in bioremediation
- LDU decomposition, a factorization of matrices found in linear algebra
- Linear Drive Unit, a type of orbital replacement unit used on the International Space Station

== Other uses ==
- Lahad Datu Airport (IATA code), Sabah, Malaysia
- Lawrence Debate Union, the official debate team of the University of Vermont
- Liga Deportiva Universitaria (disambiguation), several Ecuadorian football clubs
- Local Delivery Unit, last three digits of a Canadian postal code
- Luke Davies-Uniacke (born 1999), Australian rules footballer
