= LTU =

LTU may refer to:

== Companies ==
- LTU Austria (LTU Billa Lufttransport Unternehmen GmbH), a former airline in Vienna, Austria
- LTU International, former German airline acquired by Air Berlin
- LTU Technologies, software company
- Air Lituanica, ICAO code LTU

== Sports ==
- Littoisten Työväen Urheilijat, a sports club from Littoinen, Finland
- LTU Aquatics, the national federation for Aquatics in body of swimming of Lithuania
- LTU, the IOC country code for Lithuania
- LTU, the ISO 3166-1 alpha-3 country code for Lithuania, used by FIFA

== Universities ==
- La Trobe University, university in Australia
- Lawrence Technological University, university in Southfield, Michigan
- Ling Tung University, university in Taichung, Taiwan
- Louisiana Tech University, university in Ruston, Louisiana
- Luleå University of Technology, university in Sweden

== Other ==
- ISO 639:ltu or Latu language, an Austronesian language spoken in Indonesia
- Land treatment unit, term in bioremediation
- Licence to use, type of intellectual property licence
- LTU-Arena, former name of Merkur Spiel-Arena in Düsseldorf, Germany
- IATA code for Latur Airport, India

== See also ==
- LT (disambiguation)
