= L&T =

L&T may refer to:

- Larsen & Toubro, a large Indian engineering and construction conglomerate
- Lemon & Te Aroha, a New Zealand soft drink
- Lord & Taylor, the oldest department store chain in the United States

== See also ==
- LT (disambiguation)
