= LT =

LT may refer to:

== Art and media ==
- Ladytron, a British electronic band
- Living Things (Linkin Park album), 2012
- Looney Tunes, theatrical cartoon series

== Companies and organisations ==
- LTU International, a German airline (IATA code LT)
- Air Lituanica, a Lithuanian airline (IATA code LT)
- LJ Air, a Chinese airline (IATA code LT)
- Labour Together, a British think tank
- Larsen & Toubro, an Indian engineering conglomerate, officially known as L&T
- Life Teen, a Roman Catholic organization for youth ministry
- London Transport (brand), the name for various transport authorities
- Lord & Taylor, a North American luxury department store chain
- Lorien Trust, a company that runs live roleplaying games
- Lucent Technologies (old company), which merged with Alcatel to form Alcatel-Lucent

== People ==
- Lawrence Tanter (1949-2026), Los Angeles Lakers announcer
- Lawrence Taylor, retired American football outside linebacker
- Lorna Tolentino (born 1961), Filipino actress with screen name L.T.
- LaDainian Tomlinson, retired American football running back

== Places ==
- Lithuania (ISO 3166 code)
  - Lithuanian language (ISO 639-1 code)
- Province of Latina, Italy (vehicle plate code)
- Long Trail, a footpath in the American state of Vermont

== Science, technology, and mathematics ==
=== Biology and medicine ===
- Lactate threshold, a measurement used by athletes to determine the amount of strenuous work capable by their muscles
- Lymphotoxin, a cytokine
- Gallid alphaherpesvirus 1, the cause of infectious laryngotracheitis in poultry
- SV40 large T antigen, a proto-oncogene derived from polyomavirus SV40
- Heat-labile enterotoxin, a toxin produced by enterotoxigenic Escherichia coli
- Haplogroup LT, a Y-chromosome DNA haplogroup

=== Electronics and computing ===
- .lt, Internet country code top-level domain for Lithuania
- LaGrande Technology, former name for the Trusted Execution Technology (Intel's implementation of Trusted Computing)
- Left total, in sound recording, the left channel of the stereo Left total/Right total downmix
- Lightning Talk, a very short presentation lasting only a few minutes, given at a conference or similar forum.
- Linear Technology, manufacturer of integrated circuits
- Link Training, process by which the transmitter and receiver on a high-speed serial link communicate with each other in order to tune their equalization settings
- Logic Theorist, a computer program written in 1955–56 to prove mathematical theorems; called "the first artificial intelligence program"
- LanguageTool, an extension for many web browsers
- &lt;, the HTML code for the less-than sign

=== Mathematics ===
- Laplace transform
- Less than
- Logic Theorist, a computer program written in 1955–56 to prove mathematical theorems; called "the first artificial intelligence program"
- Lorentz transformation

=== Vehicles ===
- LT, a type of London bus
- LT (car), an early Swedish automobile
- LT, a trim level for Chevrolet vehicles
- GM LT1 engine several engines by General Motors
- Lincoln Mark LT
- Volkswagen LT, a light truck
- McLaren 675LT, a British supercar
- Logistics Trainer, code name for the Lockheed F-117 Nighthawk stealth attack aircraft
- International LT, a Class 8 truck built by International which replaced the Prostar series

=== Other uses in science, technology, and mathematics ===
- La Tène culture, an archaeological culture
- Long ton, a unit of measurement

== Other uses ==
- Lead time, the latency between initiation and execution, as in supply chain management
- Left tackle, a position in American and Canadian football
- Lieutenant, sometimes abbreviated as Lt, Lt. Lieut, and similar
- Lisbon Treaty, a 2007 agreement amending the constitutional basis of the European Union
- Lithuanian language (ISO 639-1 code)
- Lithuanian litas (Lt), former currency of Lithuania, replaced by the Euro in 2015
- Local Time, in the context of time zones

== See also ==
- BLT, a sandwich consisting of bacon, lettuce, and tomato on bread
- LTU (disambiguation)
