= Orbital replacement unit (HST) =

An orbital replacement unit or orbital replaceable unit is a modular component of spacecraft that can be replaced upon failure either by robot or by extravehicular activity. The Hubble Space Telescope (HST) was designed with 70 such parts, including scientific instruments and limited-life items such as batteries.

On HST some parts were designed from the start as ORUs and all used captive bolts with a standard 7/16" double-height hex head; later when it was decided to avoid returning HST to Earth for repair, more systems and modules were designated as ORUs (but used a wider variety of fasteners). HST servicing mission 3A (SM3A) replaced (or added) 15 ORUs, e.g. it replaced the DF-224 computer with the Advanced Computer.

The electrical system of the International Space Station also has such subsystems that provide power generation, power distribution and energy storage.

== See also ==
- Hubble Space Telescope § Servicing missions and new instruments
- Orbital replacement unit, about the ISS ORUs
- Line-replaceable unit
