= LT (car) =

LT was a Swedish car made by Anders Rudolf Lindström, Gottfrid Hansson and Simon Resare.

It got its name from the initials of "Lindström and Torsby" the designer Anders Rudolf Lindström and Torsby in northern Värmland, Sweden, but it was nicknamed "Långsam tillverkning" (Swedish for "slow production").

Car production was first planned in 1909 or possibly earlier, but this first car wasn't a success. In 1923 they made a second model. It had a painted grille, raked windscreen and the design may have been inspired by French cars like the Avions Voisin. It was powered by an air-cooled, two-cylinder engine of their own design and cast at Solbergs Mekaniska in Forshaga. The engine produced 20 HP and was connected to a three-speed gearbox driving the front wheels. The chassis was made of steel tubing and the bodywork of wood veneer. A series of 50 cars was planned, but money was a problem.

A car dealer approached Lindström wanting to hire him for his own production, but Lindström declined the offer hoping for better days to come but the workshop was destroyed in a fire and that was the end of LT with only three cars made. The rights were taken over by a company in Örebro for a modest sum. Today all that remains are some photos, one engine and some casting models at Torsby Fordonsmuseum.
