= Õru =

Borough in Estonia

- Small borough
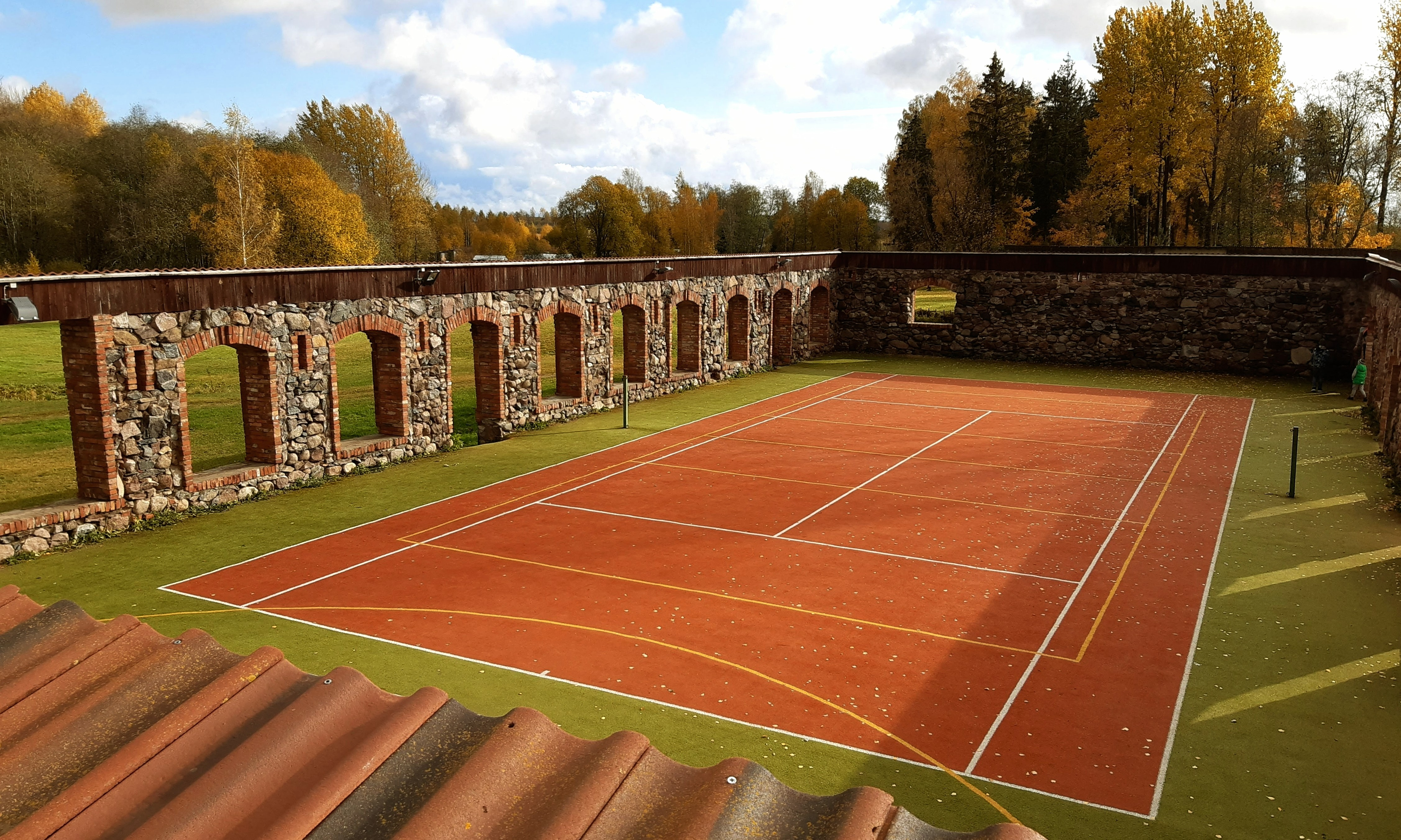
- Õru sports field

- Location in Estonia
- Coordinates: 57°55′33″N 26°10′43″E
- Country: Estonia
- County: Valga County
- Municipality: Valga Parish
- Founded: 1950s–1960s

Population (2011 Census)
  - Total: 178

Õru is a small borough (alevik) in Valga Parish, Valga County, southern Estonia. Between 1992 and 2017, prior to the administrative reform of Estonian local governments, it was the administrative centre of Õru Parish. As of the 2011 census, the settlement's population was 178.

The Tartu–Valga road (part of E264) passes through Õru.

Õru was established in the 1950s–1960s as the centre of the Vaiga sovkhoz.

Besides local government there is a kindergarten-elementary school, library and post office located in Õru.

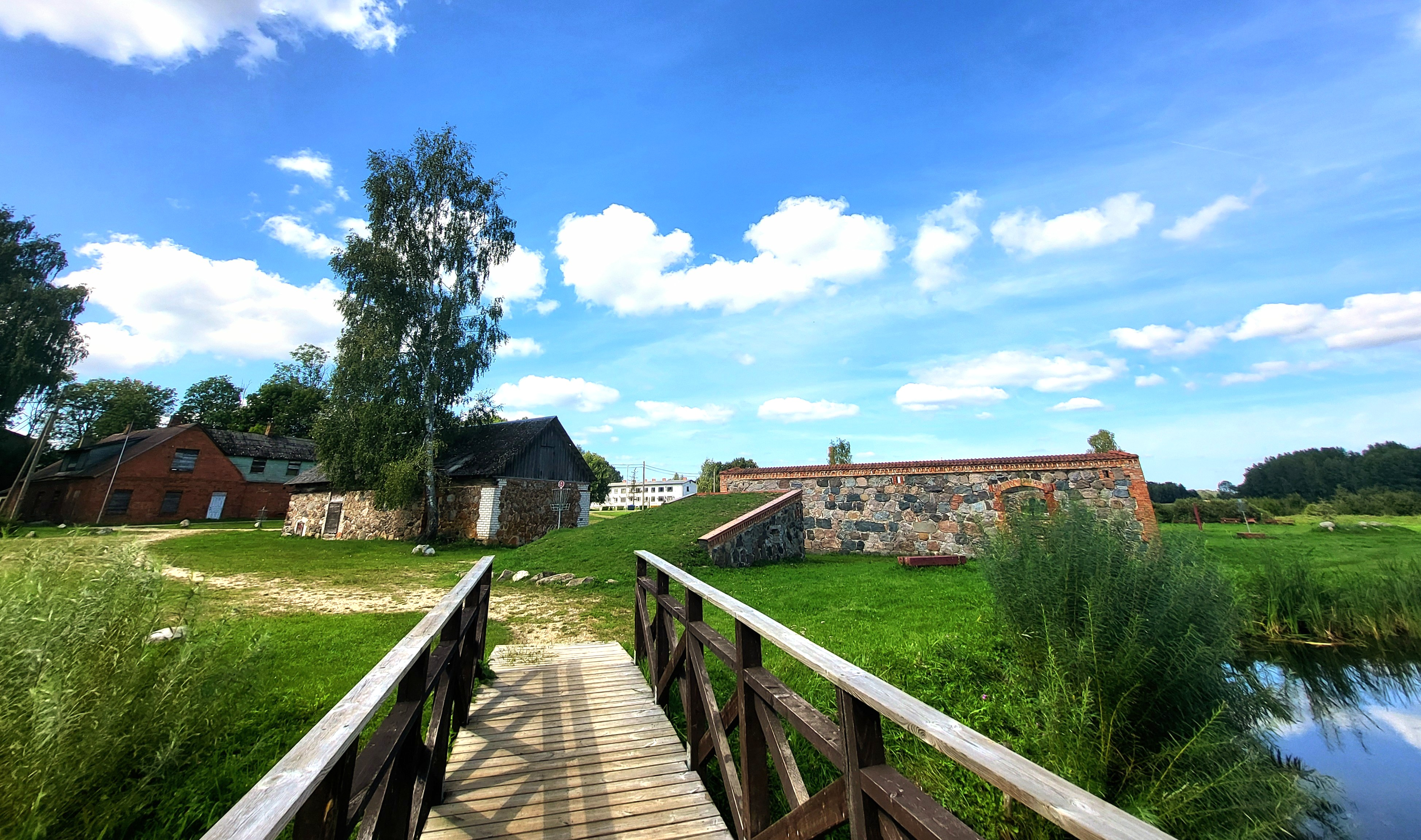
Õru
