= Licence to use =

A licence to use (LTU) is a licence to use an intellectual property such as a patent or trademark. This is distinct from other types of licence such as a licence to manufacture or copy the invention or design. It is the sort of licence commonly issued for the use of computer software.
