= Liga Deportiva Universitaria =

Liga Deportiva Universitaria ('University Sporting League'), may refer to the following Ecuadorian football teams:

- L.D.U. Cuenca
- L.D.U. Loja
- L.D.U. Portoviejo
- LDU Quito
