= Land treatment unit =

A land treatment unit (LTU) is a location in which land is treated, usually through bioremediation processes, to reduce the toxicity of the soil.

Land treatment units are areas where hazardous waste is applied or incorporated into the soil surface. Land treatment units are typically units consisting of natural soils where natural biological and chemical degradation and attenuation processes immobilize, transform, or degrade hazardous constituents over time.

LTUs are becoming more common as more sites requiring clean-up are identified.

== See also ==
- Land disposal unit
