= Land disposal unit =

A land disposal unit, or LDU, is a site in which hazardous waste is remedied through natural and man-made processes. "Land disposal" of hazardous waste is defined in the U.S. Resource Conservation and Recovery Act (RCRA). Types of LDUs for hazardous waste disposal:

- Landfill
- Surface impoundment
- Waste pile
- Land treatment unit
- Injection well
- Salt dome formation
- Salt bed formation
- Mine
- Cave.
