= J2 =

J2, J.II or J-2 may refer to:

== Codes and classifications ==
- J2, the IATA airline designator for Azerbaijan Airlines
- J-2 visa, a nonimmigrant visa issued by the United States for spouses and dependents of J-1 visa exchange visitors
- ATC code J02, a subgroup of the Anatomical Therapeutic Chemical Classification System
- Janko group J2 in mathematics
- Jinja2, a Python template engine that uses file extension .j2

== Science and technology ==
- Haplogroup J2 (Y-DNA), a Y-DNA haplogroup
- $J_2 \,$ coefficient, the second dynamic form factor of Earth or another celestial body
- $J_2 \,$, the second invariant of the deviatoric stress tensor
- Johnson solid J2, the equilateral pentagonal pyramid
- S/2003 J 2, the provisional designation of Jupiter LXXIII, a retrograde irregular satellite of Jupiter

== People and organizations ==
- j2 Global Communications, a tech company best known for electronic fax services
- J2 (music channel), a former New Zealand music TV Channel
- TVB J2, former names of TVB Plus, a digital TV channel of Television Broadcasts Limited
- J. League Division 2, the second-tier of Japanese professional association football
- Jefatura de Inteligencia del Estado Mayor Conjunto de las Fuerzas Armadas (J-2), an Argentine intelligence agency
- J2, the Intelligence Directorate of the United States Joint Chiefs of Staff
- Director of Military Intelligence, the head of Irish Defence Forces intelligence, sometimes referred to as J2

== Vehicles ==
- Rocketdyne J-2, a rocket engine used in the Saturn rockets and intended for use on the Space Launch System
- AEG J.II, a World War I German ground attack aircraft
- Albatros J.II, a World War I German single-engine, single-seat, biplane ground-attack aircraft
- Allard J2, any of several postwar American market-designed English cars
- Auster J-2 Arrow, a 1945 British single-engined two-seat high-wing touring monoplane
- HMAS J2, an Australian submarine
- JAC J2, a city car produced by JAC Motors
- Junkers J 2, a 1916 all-metal German fighter prototype aircraft
- LB&SCR J2 class, a British LB&SCR locomotive
- McCulloch J-2, a 1962 small, two-seat autogyro
- MG J-type, a 2-seat sports car produced by the MG Car company from 1932 to 1934
- Morris Commercial J2 small forward-control van produced from 1956 to 1967
- Taylor J-2, a 1935 American two-seat light aircraft
- Mikoyan-Gurevich MiG-15, an aircraft called J-2 in China
- Rocketdyne J-2, a cryogenic rocket engine used on Saturn V Moon rocket

== Other uses ==
- J2, a comicbook character, son of Juggernaut
- J2 (orca), or Granny (c. 1936–1951 – c. 2016), a killer whale
- J2 League, Japanese football league
- County Route J2 (California)
- J2 (roller coaster), or Hell Cat, a roller coaster at Clementon Amusement Park
- Samsung Galaxy J2, an Android smartphone
- Samsung Galaxy J2 Prime, a successor smartphone, also known as the Samsung Galaxy J2 Ace
- J2, an open-source clone of the Hitachi/Renesas SuperH-2 microcontroller
- Nikon 1 J2, mirrorless interchangeable lens camera

== See also ==
- JII (disambiguation)
- 2J (disambiguation)
