= 2J =

2J or 2-J may refer to:

- 2J, International Air Transport Association code for Air Burkina
- Chaparral 2J, a model of Chaparral Cars
- 2J, an abbreviation for Second Epistle of John
- Kawasaki P-2J, Japanese derivative of the Lockheed P-2 Neptune, an American military aircraft
- HQ-2J, a Chinese military missile
- Thor DSV-2J, see Thor DSV-2
- ISS 2J/A, alternate designator for Space Shuttle mission no. STS-127
- SSH 2J (WA), see Washington State Route 527
- Thompson School District R2-J

== See also ==
- J2 (disambiguation)
