= Peter Nickolenko =

American launch director

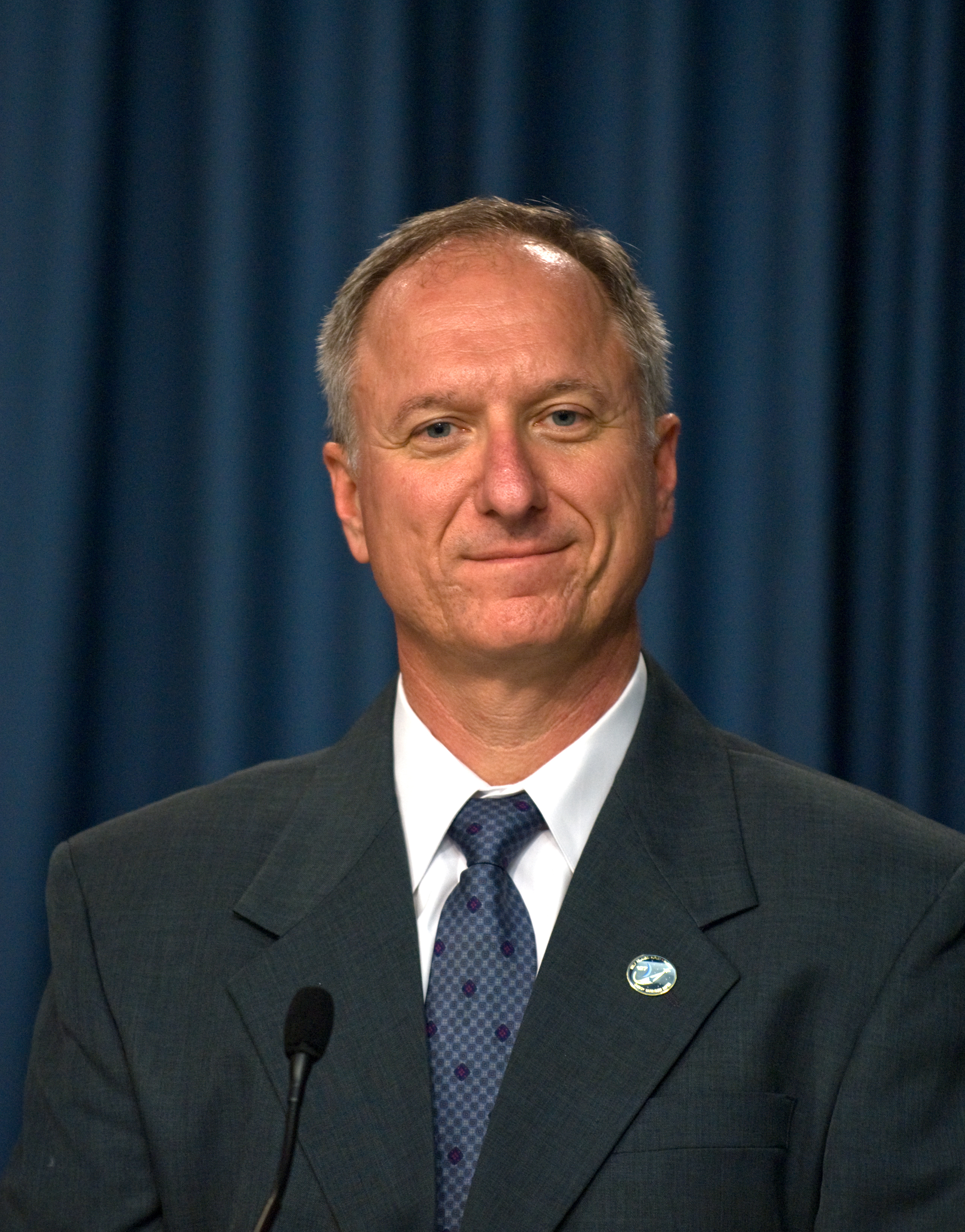
Pete Nickolenko during the launch countdown of STS-127 at the KSC.

Peter P. "Pete" Nickolenko is a launch director for the National Aeronautics and Space Administration. Nickolenko was responsible for the safe launch of Space Shuttle vehicles from the Kennedy Space Center.

Nickolenko is a graduate from the U.S. Military Academy in West Point, New York, and served in the United States Army for six years. After being hired as an engineer for NASA in 1990, Nickolenko continued work until being promoted to launch and landing test director in 1992. He was somehow involved in a major operation of launch processing in each Space Shuttle mission from 1992.

Nickolenko served as one of NASA's lead launch directors. He led the launch of STS-127 and STS-128, both of which required numerous scrubs and difficult decisions regarding launch safety. He also has been employed with Texas Instruments. He also attains the position of Chief of the Launch and Landing Division of Vehicle Processing. In April 2010 he was the leader director for the STS-131 flight.

== External links and sources ==
- NASA Biography
