= J11 =

J11 may refer to:

== Vehicles ==
=== Aircraft ===
- Fiat J 11, an Italian sesquiplane fighter in service with the Swedish Air Force
- Junkers J 11, a German ground-attack aircraft
- Shenyang J-11, a Chinese jet fighter

=== Automobiles ===
- James Comet J11, an English motorcycle
- Nissan Qashqai J11, a Japanese SUV

=== Locomotives ===
- GSR Class J11, an Irish steam locomotive
- LNER Class J11, a class of British steam locomotives

=== Ships ===
- HMS Bramble (J11), a Halcyon-class minesweeper of the Royal Navy
- HSwMS Visby (J11), a Visby-class destroyer of the Swedish Navy

== Other uses ==
- County Route J11 (California)
- DEC J-11, a microprocessor chip set
- Gyroelongated pentagonal pyramid, a Johnson solid (J_{11})

== See also ==
- JII (disambiguation)
