= JII =

JII may refer to:

- -ji, an honorific suffix in Hindustani and other Indian languages
- Jakarta Islamic Index
- Jiiddu language
- John Innes Institute
- JPMorgan Indian Investment Trust
- Sinopterus jii, an extinct species of pterosaur
- Sinocyclocheilus jii, a species of ray-finned fish
- Albatros J.II, a World War I German biplane

== See also ==
- J11 (disambiguation)
