= STS-127 =

2009 American crewed spaceflight to the ISS

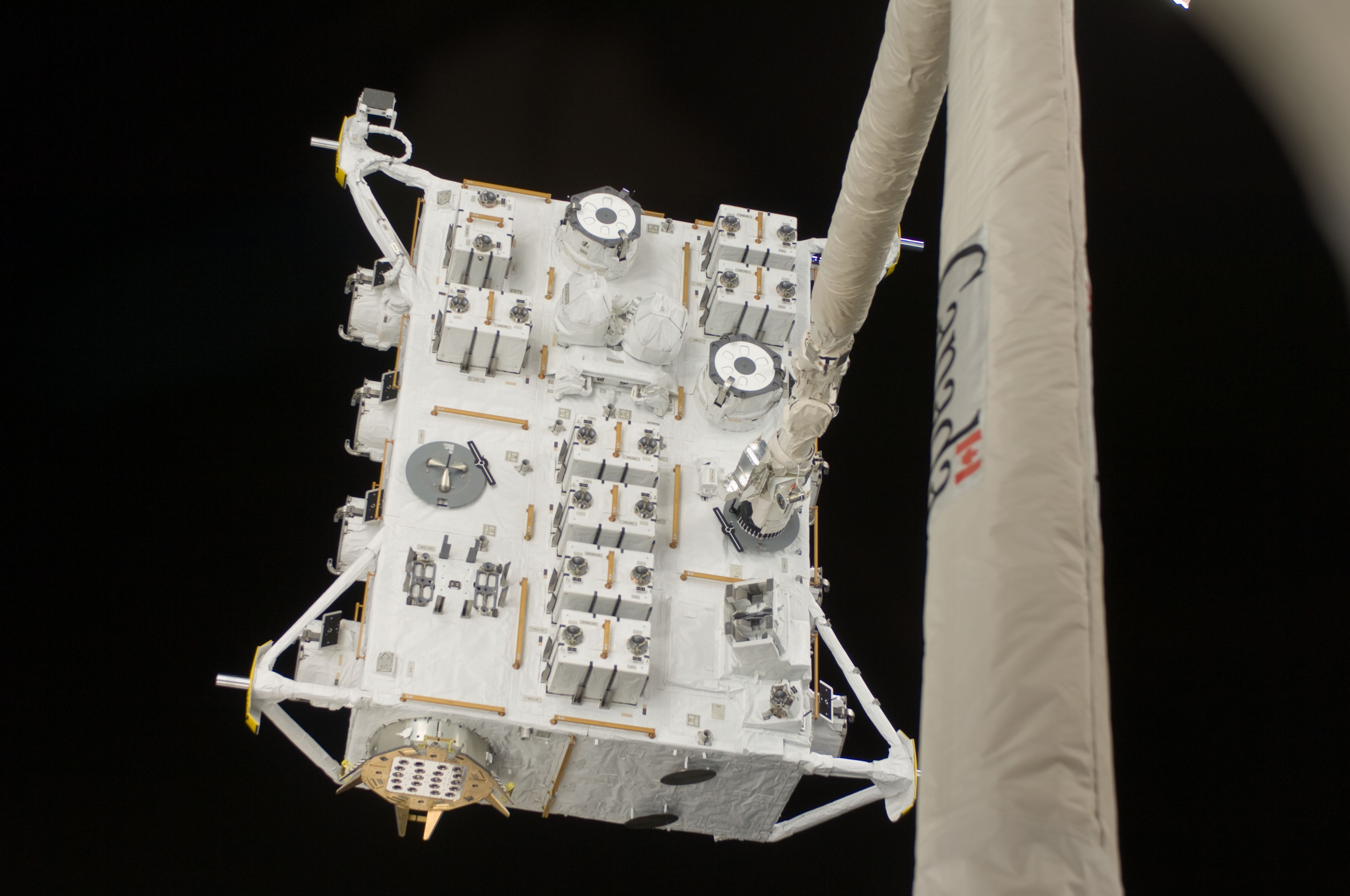
- Canadarm2 grapples the exposed facility of Kibō, prior to its installation on the ISS
- Names: Space Transportation System-127
- Mission type: ISS assembly
- Operator: NASA
- COSPAR ID: 2009-038A
- SATCAT no.: 35633
- Mission duration: 15 days, 16 hours, 44 minutes, 58 seconds
- Distance travelled: 10,537,748 kilometres (6,547,853 mi)
- Orbits completed: 248

Spacecraft properties
- Spacecraft: Space Shuttle Endeavour

Crew
- Crew size: 7
- Members: Mark L. Polansky; Douglas G. Hurley; Christopher J. Cassidy; Julie Payette; Thomas H. Marshburn; David Wolf
- Launching: Timothy Kopra
- Landing: Koichi Wakata

Start of mission
- Launch date: July 15, 2009, 22:03 UTC
- Launch site: Kennedy, LC-39A

End of mission
- Landing date: July 31, 2009, 14:48 UTC
- Landing site: Kennedy, SLF Runway 15

Orbital parameters
- Reference system: Geocentric
- Regime: Low Earth
- Perigee altitude: 344 kilometres (214 mi)
- Apogee altitude: 351 kilometres (218 mi)
- Inclination: 51.6 degrees
- Period: 91.48 minutes
- Epoch: July 18, 2009

Docking with ISS
- Docking port: PMA-2 (Harmony forward)
- Docking date: July 17, 2009 17:47 UTC
- Undocking date: July 28, 2009 17:26 UTC
- Time docked: 10 days, 23 hours, 41 minutes
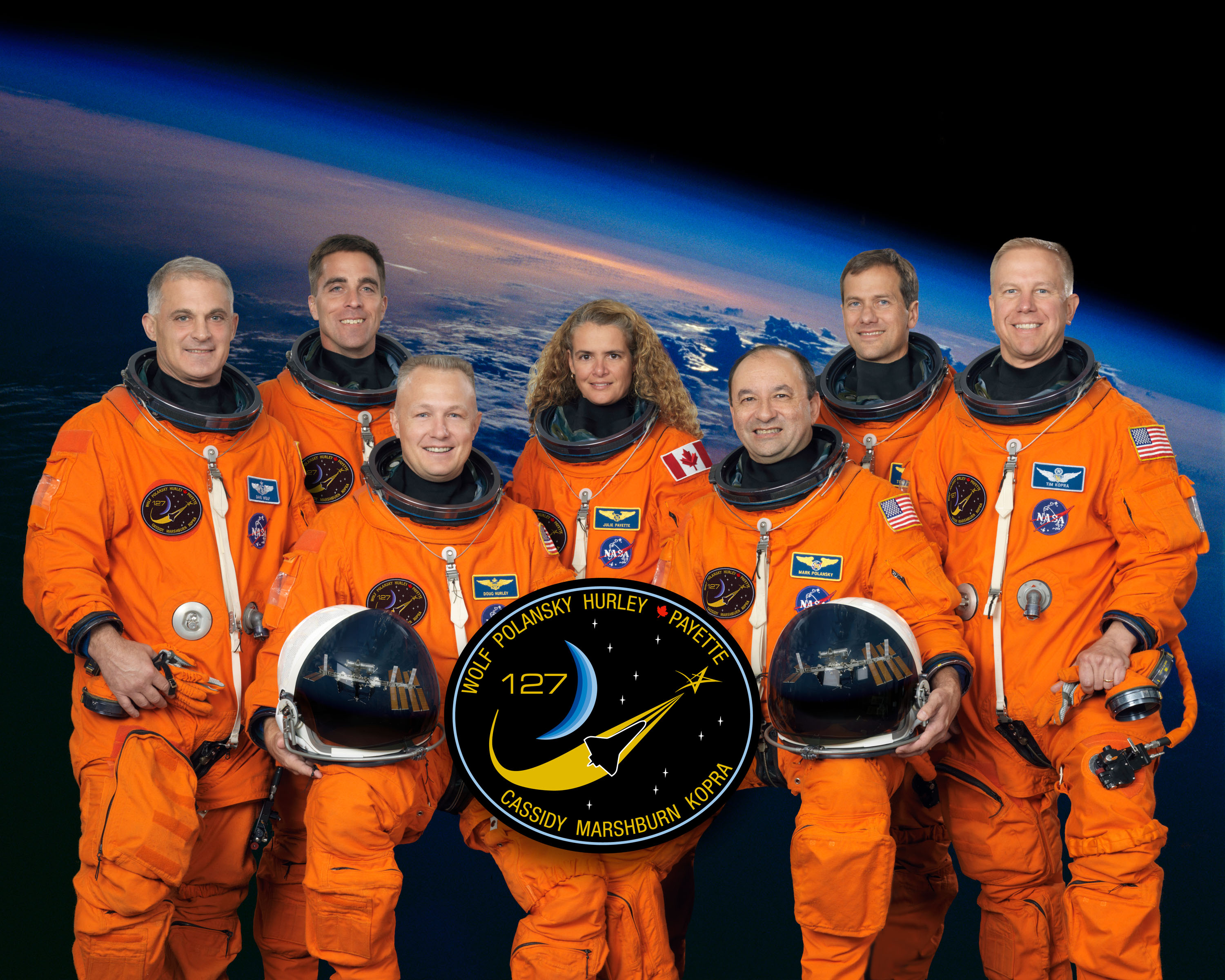
- From left to right: Wolf, Cassidy, Hurley, Payette, Polansky, Marshburn, and Kopra Space Shuttle program

STS-127 (ISS assembly flight 2J/A) was a NASA Space Shuttle mission to the International Space Station (ISS). It was the twenty-third flight of Space Shuttle Endeavour. The primary purpose of the STS-127 mission was to deliver and install the final two components of the Japanese Experiment Module: the Exposed Facility (JEM EF), and the Exposed Section of the Experiment Logistics Module (ELM-ES). When Endeavour docked with the ISS on this mission in July 2009, it set a record for the most humans in space at the same time in the same vehicle, the first time thirteen people have been at the station at the same time. Together they represented all ISS program partners and tied the general record of thirteen people in space with the first such occurrence of 1995.

The first launch attempt, on June 13, 2009, was scrubbed due to a gaseous hydrogen leak observed during tanking. The Ground Umbilical Carrier Plate (GUCP) on the external fuel tank experienced a potentially hazardous hydrogen gas leak similar to the fault that delayed the Space Shuttle Discovery mission STS-119 in March 2009. Since a launch date of June 18, 2009, would have conflicted with the launch of the Lunar Reconnaissance Orbiter (LRO)/Lunar Crater Observation and Sensing Satellite (LCROSS), NASA managers discussed the scheduling conflict with both the Lunar Reconnaissance Orbiter project and the Air Force Eastern Range, which provides tracking support for rockets launched from Florida. A decision was made to allow the shuttle to attempt a second launch on June 17, 2009, allowing LRO to launch on June 18, 2009.

The second launch attempt on June 17, 2009, was also scrubbed due to hydrogen leak issues seen from the Ground Umbilical Carrier Plate. Due to conflicts with the launch of the LRO, and due to a beta angle constraint, the next available launch opportunity was scheduled for July 11, 2009. A successful tanking test for leak checks was performed on July 1, 2009, with modified GUCP seals allowing launch preparations to proceed as scheduled. Because of lightning strikes near the launch pad during the evening of July 10, 2009, NASA scrubbed the launch for the third time and rescheduled for July 12, 2009. Due to a Return To Launch Site (RTLS) weather violation, NASA scrubbed the launch for the fourth time on the evening of July 12, 2009.

STS-127's fifth launch attempt, on July 13, 2009, was also scrubbed due to anvil clouds and lightning within 10 nautical miles (19 km) of the launch site, which violated launch safety rules. STS-127 finally launched successfully on its sixth launch attempt, on July 15, 2009, at 18:03 EDT. Pieces of foam were observed falling off of the External Tank during the ascent, the same occurrence that had led to the loss of Columbia in 2003. However, Endeavour received only minor scuffs to its heat shield, the damage not enough to cause concern over reentry. The shuttle landed at Kennedy Space Center 16 days later at 10:48 EDT on July 31, 2009.

== Crew ==
Position	Launching Astronaut	Landing Astronaut
Commander	(United States) Mark L. Polansky; Third and last spaceflight	
Pilot	(United States) Douglas G. Hurley; First spaceflight	
Mission Specialist 1	(United States) Christopher J. Cassidy; First spaceflight	
Mission Specialist 2 Flight Engineer	(Canada) Julie Payette, CSA; Second and last spaceflight	
Mission Specialist 3	(United States) Thomas H. Marshburn; First spaceflight	
Mission Specialist 4	(United States) David Wolf; Fourth and last spaceflight	
Mission Specialist 5	(United States) Timothy Kopra; Expedition 20; First spaceflight	(Japan) Koichi Wakata, JAXA; Expedition 20; Third spaceflight
STS-127 marked the first time that two Canadian astronauts, Robert Thirsk and Julie Payette, were in space at the same time. Christopher Cassidy was the 500th person to fly in space.

=== Crew seat assignments ===
Seat	Launch	Landing	Seats 1–4 are on the flight deck. Seats 5–7 are on the mid-deck.
1	Polansky		Seats 1–4 are on the flight deck. Seats 5–7 are on the mid-deck.
2	Hurley		Seats 1–4 are on the flight deck. Seats 5–7 are on the mid-deck.
3	Cassidy	Wolf	Seats 1–4 are on the flight deck. Seats 5–7 are on the mid-deck.
4	Payette		Seats 1–4 are on the flight deck. Seats 5–7 are on the mid-deck.
5	Wolf	Cassidy	Seats 1–4 are on the flight deck. Seats 5–7 are on the mid-deck.
6	Marshburn		Seats 1–4 are on the flight deck. Seats 5–7 are on the mid-deck.
7	Kopra	Wakata	Seats 1–4 are on the flight deck. Seats 5–7 are on the mid-deck.

== Mission payload ==
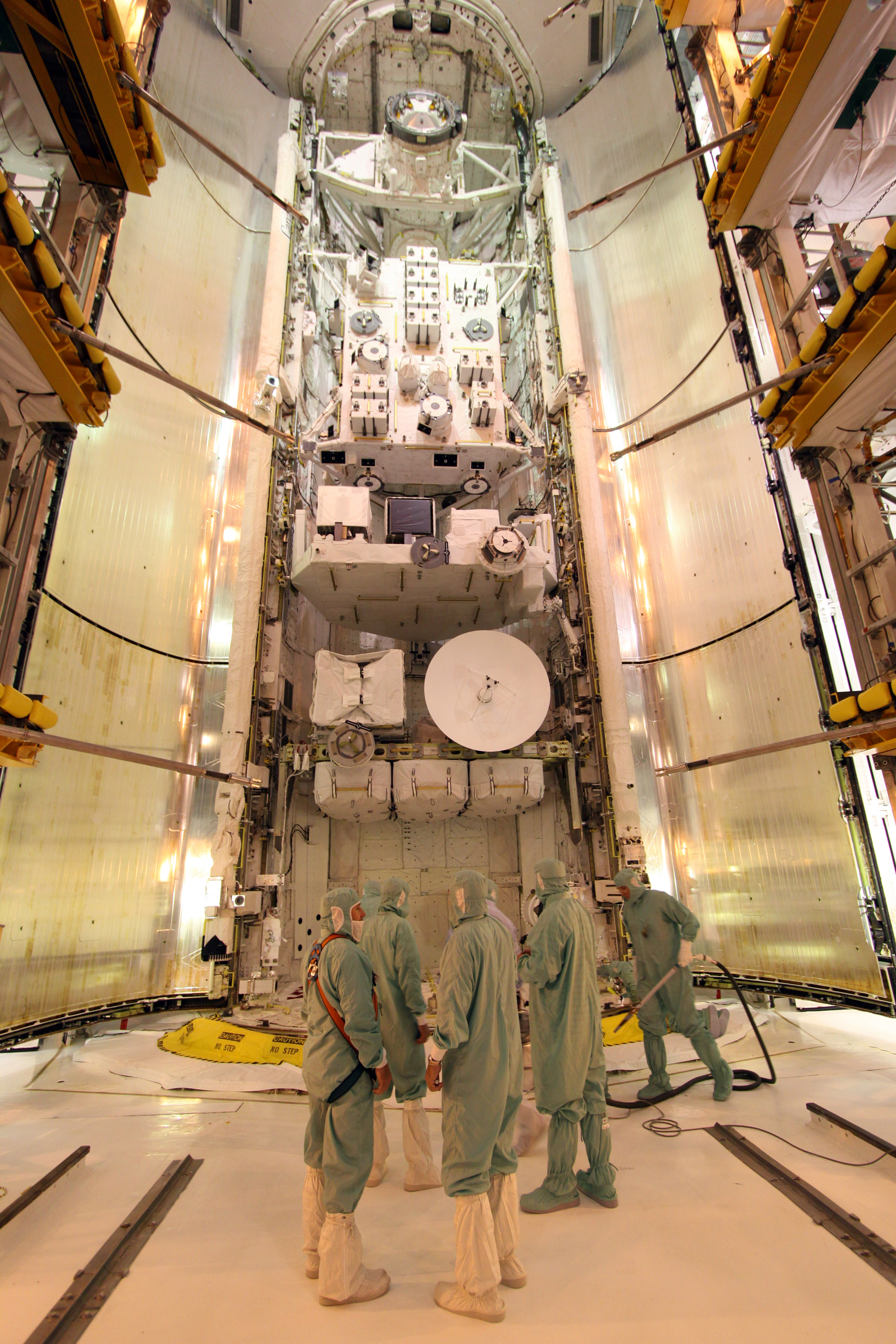
Payload bay of the shuttle being loaded inside the cleanroom of the Rotating Service Structure.

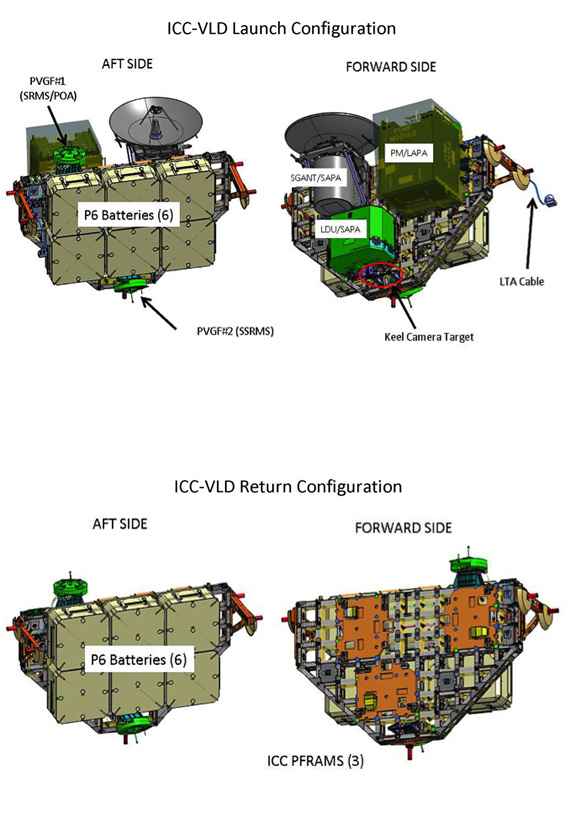
ICC-VLD1 STS-127

Endeavour carried a wide variety of equipment and cargo in the payload bay, with the largest item being the Kibō Japanese Experiment Module Exposed Facility (JEM EF), and the Kibō Japanese Experiment Logistics Module – Exposed Section (ELM-ES). The exposed facility is a part of Kibō that will allow astronauts to perform science experiments that are exposed to the vacuum of space. The exposed section is similar to the logistics module on the Kibō laboratory, but is not pressurized. Once its payloads were transferred to the JEM EF, the ELM-ES was returned to the payload bay.

Also inside the payload bay was an Integrated Cargo Carrier-Vertical Light Deployable (ICC-VLD), containing a variety of equipment and spare components for the station. The carrier contained six new batteries for installation on the P6 truss, that was installed during two of the mission's spacewalks, as well as a spare space-to-ground antenna and a spare linear drive unit and pump module which was stored on an external stowage platform on the station's truss during one of the spacewalks.

Two satellites were also carried by the orbiter, for deployment when the mission ended. The Dual Autonomous Global Positioning System On-Orbit Navigator Satellite, called DRAGONSAT, gathers data on autonomous spacecraft rendezvous and docking capabilities, and consists of two picosatellites, the AggieSat2, and PARADIGM (BEVO-1), which acquire GPS data from a device at NASA and send it to ground stations at Texas A&M University and the University of Texas at Austin. After release, the two picosatellites remained attached for two orbits to collect GPS data, and separated during the third orbit.

A second satellite, the Atmospheric Neutral Density Experiment (ANDE-2), is part of a United States Department of Defense project flown by the Naval Research Laboratory to provide high-quality satellites, and will measure the density and composition of the low Earth orbit atmosphere while being tracked from the ground, to better predict the movement and decay of objects in orbit. ANDE-2 consists of two spherical microsatellites, ANDE Active spacecraft (Castor) and the ANDE Passive spacecraft (Pollux), and will be tracked by the International Laser Ranging Service (ILRS) network as well as the Space Surveillance Network (SSN). One of the satellites, Pollux, is running Arduino libraries, with its payload programmed and built by students.

A set of experiments to be deployed on the ISS were carried by STS-127, including Dosimetry for Biological Experiments in Space (ESA), Validation of Procedures for Monitoring Crew Member Immune Function, the student-made Image Reversal in Space (CSA/ISU), Nutritional Status Assessment (NASA), NASA Biological Specimen Repository and Tomatosphere-II (CSA).

The STS-127 Official Flight Kit (OFK) included water samples from each of the five Great Lakes, a resin statue of a water droplet for the One Drop Foundation, and a copy of Beethoven's Fifth Symphony for the Montreal Symphony Orchestra, among other mementos.

The docking module was also mounted with the DragonEye 3D Flash LIDAR ranging system manufactured by Advanced Scientific Concepts, Inc. The module was launched to test the docking system which will be used by the commercial SpaceX Dragon re-usable cargo carrier to send supplies to the ISS during the post-shuttle era. The Dragon spacecraft made its successful maiden flight in December 2010.

Location	Cargo	Mass
Bays 1–2	Orbiter Docking System; EMU 3003 / EMU 3018; SpaceX DragonEye LIDAR	1,800 kilograms (4,000 lb); ~260 kilograms (570 lb)
Bay 3P	Shuttle Power; Distribution Unit (SPDU)	~17 kilograms (37 lb)
Bay 3S	APC/SSPL; Dragonsat	51 kilograms (112 lb); 6 k
Bays 4–7	Kibō JEM Exposed Facility	3,820 kilograms (8,420 lb)
Bay 5P	APC/ECSH	~33 kilograms (73 lb)
Bay 5S	APC/PPSU	20 kilograms (44 lb)
Bay 6S	APC/PPSU	20 kilograms (44 lb)
Bays 8–9	Kibō ELM Exposed Section	2,453 kilograms (5,408 lb)
Bay 11	ICC-VLD	3,946 kilograms (8,699 lb)
Bay 13P	APC/ECSH	~33 kilograms (73 lb)
Bay 13S	SPA/CAPE/ANDE-2; ICU container ANDE Active satellite ANDE Passive satellite	265 kilograms (584 lb); 54 kilograms (119 lb); 50 kilograms (110 lb); 25 kilograms (55 lb)
Starboard Sill	Orbiter Boom Sensor System	~382 kilograms (842 lb)
Port Sill	Canadarm	410 kilograms (900 lb)
	Total:	13,645 kilograms (30,082 lb)

== Mission milestones ==
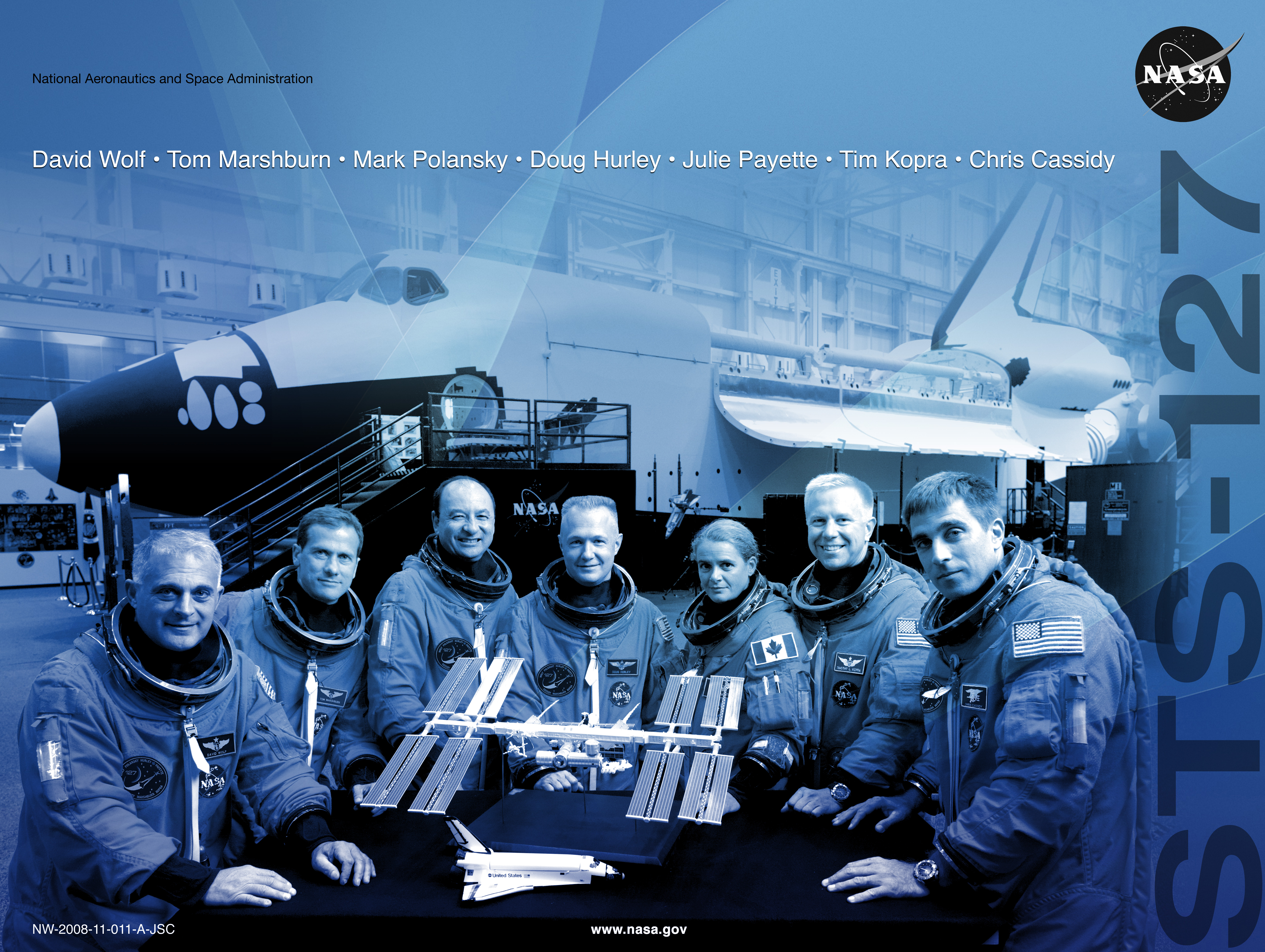
Mission poster

The mission marked:

- 158th NASA crewed space flight
- 128th Space Shuttle mission
- 127th shuttle mission since STS-1
- 23rd flight of Space Shuttle Endeavour
- 29th shuttle mission to the ISS
- 102nd post-Challenger mission
- 14th post-Columbia mission
- 1st time that two Canadians have been in space at the same moment

== Shuttle processing ==
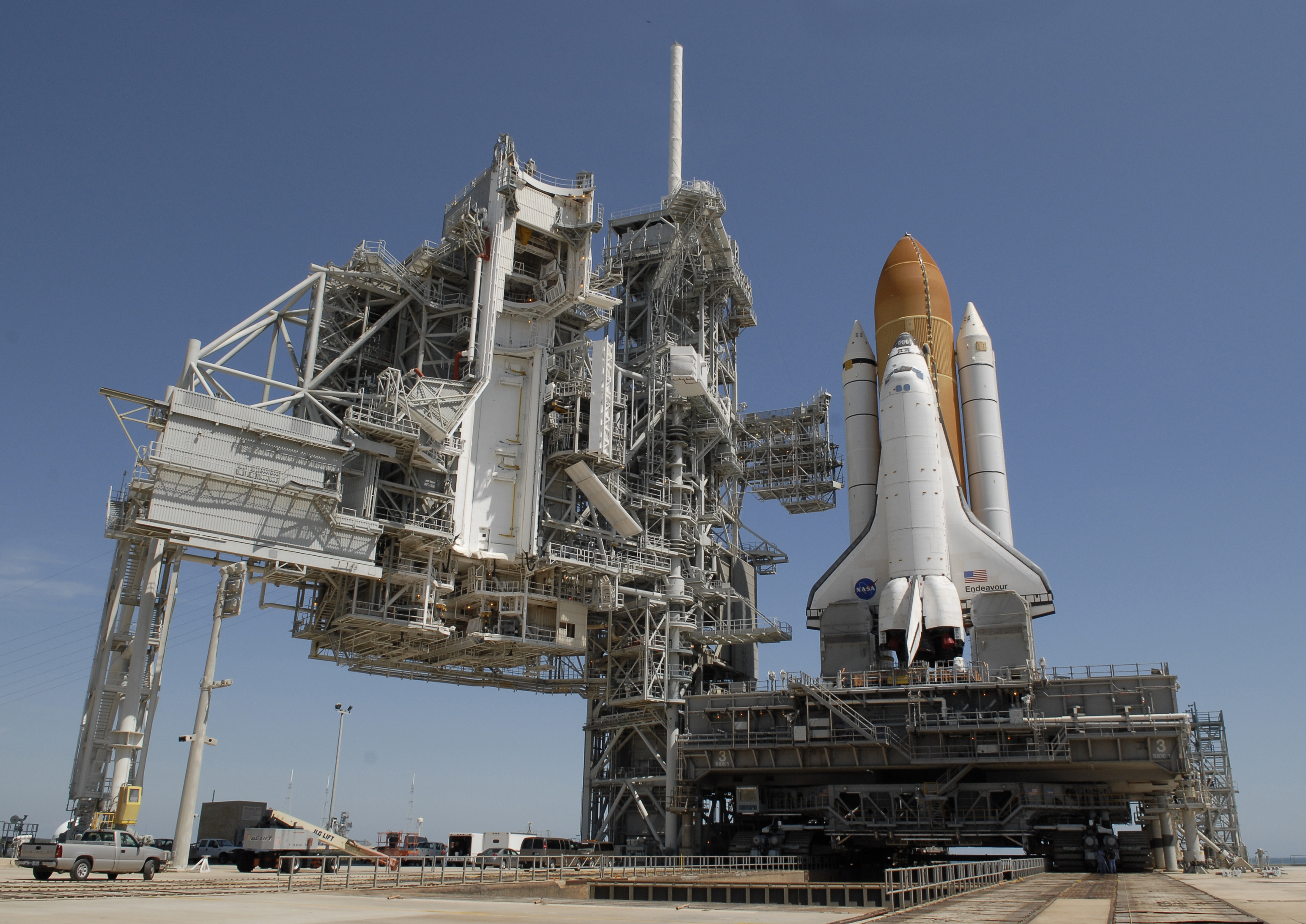
Endeavour at Launch Pad 39A

Endeavour served as the STS-400 rescue vehicle for STS-125, and was prepared for a possible liftoff from Launch Pad 39B on May 15, 2009, four days after the launch of STS-125. After Atlantis performed the late inspection and was cleared for re-entry, Endeavour was officially released from stand-by status on May 21, 2009, and preparations for STS-127 were initiated.

Endeavour moved from Launch Pad 39B to 39A on May 31, 2009, in preparation for STS-127. The crew of STS-127 arrived at Kennedy Space Center on June 2, 2009, for the Terminal Countdown Demonstration Test (TCDT) that concluded with a full launch dress rehearsal. The Flight Readiness Review (FRR), a meeting during which NASA managers assess mission preparations and officially set the launch date, concluded on June 3, 2009. For the first time, live status updates about the FRR were published periodically during the meeting via NASA's Twitter stream.

=== Launch attempts ===
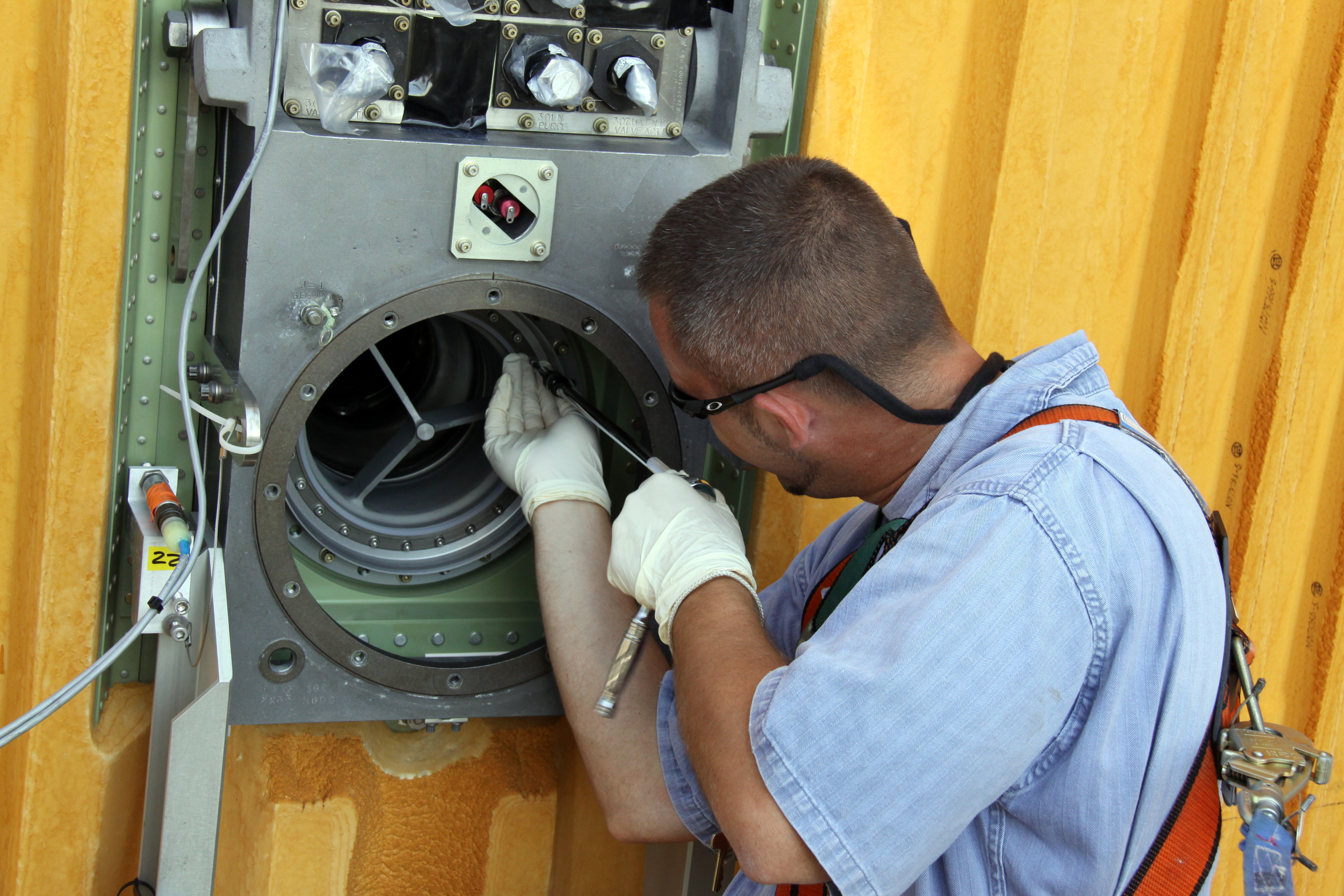
Close-up view of the Ground Umbilical Carrier Plate on STS-127's external tank during the first maintenance effort

The launch countdown began June 10, 2009, but on June 13, 2009, as tanking was underway, a gaseous hydrogen leak on a vent line near the Ground Umbilical Carrier Plate was observed, and the June 13, 2009, launch was scrubbed at 00:26 EDT. As liquid hydrogen fuel is pumped in, some of it boils off as the extremely cold liquid enters the warm external tank. The vent line valve controls the resulting buildup of gas pressure by allowing excess gas to escape into a ground-side vent line, which leads to a flare stack at a safe distance away from the pad. A similar leak situation was seen during the first launch attempt of STS-119. NASA managers met on June 14, 2009, and June 15, 2009, and evaluated the leak, discussed steps that had to be taken, and set a new launch date of June 17, 2009, at 05:40 EDT.

A second launch attempt was made on June 17, 2009, for which NASA moved the planned launch of the Lunar Reconnaissance Orbiter to a new date. On June 17, 2009, loading of the shuttle's external tank with liquid hydrogen and liquid oxygen was delayed three hours due to poor weather around the launch site, but tanking began once the weather cleared. Approximately two hours after tanking began, engineers saw leak indications in the GUCP similar to those seen during the first launch attempt. The launch was officially scrubbed at 01:55 EDT.

Following the launch scrub, Chairman of NASA's Mission Management Team LeRoy Cain noted that engineers would work to understand the hydrogen leak issue and come up with a solution to the problem. Cain said managers were hopeful that the issue could be resolved in time for the next available launch opportunity on July 11, 2009. Due to the delay of STS-127, managers noted that it was likely that the launch of STS-128 on August 7, 2009, would be pushed back slightly.

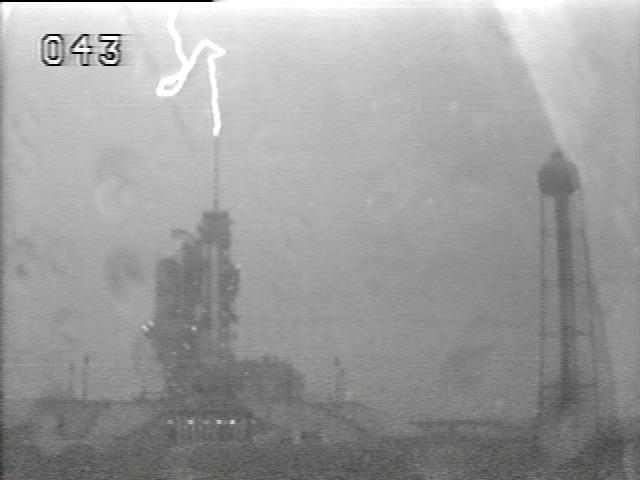
Lightning strikes Endeavour's Launch Pad.

On July 1, 2009, the shuttle managers conducted a new series of tanking tests to confirm a hypothesis that a misaligned vent port housing was the root cause of the leaks. The existing rigid seal was replaced with a flexible one in the hope that it would maintain a tight fix even under the cryogenic conditions that seem to cause the leak. The test was declared a success with no leaks detected on the GUCP. The mission was announced to be targeting a July 11, 2009, launch. On the evening of July 10, 2009, the launch pad region was hit by eleven strikes of lightning, which pushed back the July 11, 2009, launch time by at least 24 hours. Two of the strikes were strong enough to trigger an evaluation by NASA engineers. The inspections revealed that no damage had been done to the Space Shuttle.

NASA scrubbed Endeavour' July 12, 2009, launch attempt at T-minus 9 minutes and holding due to Cumulus clouds and lightning near the launch pad. During the final Go/No-Go polls, Mission Control in Houston declared a "No-Go" due to unacceptable weather forecast for a possible Return-To-Launch-Site (RTLS) abort, and planned for emergency scenarios when one or more engines shut down early leaving insufficient energy to reach the Transatlantic Abort Landing (TAL) sites. Similarly, during the July 13, 2009, attempt, RTLS weather was also "no go." Meanwhile, shuttle weather officer Kathy Winters informed the launch director, Peter Nickolenko, that the launch pad weather had changed to RED as the Phase-1 Lightning warning was issued for the Kennedy Space Center. The launch was scrubbed at T-minus 9 minutes and holding and was quickly reset for July 15, 2009 (a 48 hours scrub turn around) due to weather concerns on July 14, 2009, and the desire to replace the Tyvek covers over the forward Reaction Control System thrusters.

Attempt	Planned	Result	Turnaround	Reason	Decision point	Weather go (%)	Notes
1	13 Jun 2009, 7:17:19 am	Scrubbed	—	Technical	13 Jun 2009, 12:26 am	90%	gaseous hydrogen leak on a vent line near the Ground Umbilical Carrier Plate
2	17 Jun 2009, 5:40:52 am	Scrubbed	3 days 22 hours 24 minutes	Technical	17 Jun 2009, 1:55 am	80%	leak persisted
3	11 Jul 2009, 7:39:38 pm	Scrubbed	24 days 13 hours 59 minutes	Weather		40%	lightning strikes to launch pad
4	12 Jul 2009, 7:13:55 pm	Scrubbed	0 days 23 hours 34 minutes	Weather	12 Jul 2009, 7:00 pm (T−00:09:00 hold)	70%	RTLS concerns, cumulus clouds and lightning near launch pad
5	13 Jul 2009, 6:51:24 pm	Scrubbed	0 days 23 hours 37 minutes	Weather	13 Jul 2009, 6:39 pm (T−00:09:00 hold)	40%	Phase-1 Lightning warning at the launch site
6	15 Jul 2009, 6:03:10 pm	Success	1 day 23 hours 12 minutes			60%	

== Mission timeline ==
=== July 15 (Flight Day 1, Launch) ===
On July 15, 2009, at 18:03:10 EDT, the launch was finally successful. Upon reviewing the launch video footage, imagery analysts noted eight or nine instances of foam shedding from the External Tank. The pictures of the external tank taken when jettisoning showed loss of foam in the intertank ribbing. The chairman of the Mission Management Team was not concerned and felt that the Space Shuttle would be cleared for re-entry on its return voyage—which it was a few days later. The payload doors were opened after reaching orbit followed by deployment of the K_{u} band antenna and activation of the shuttle's mechanical arm.

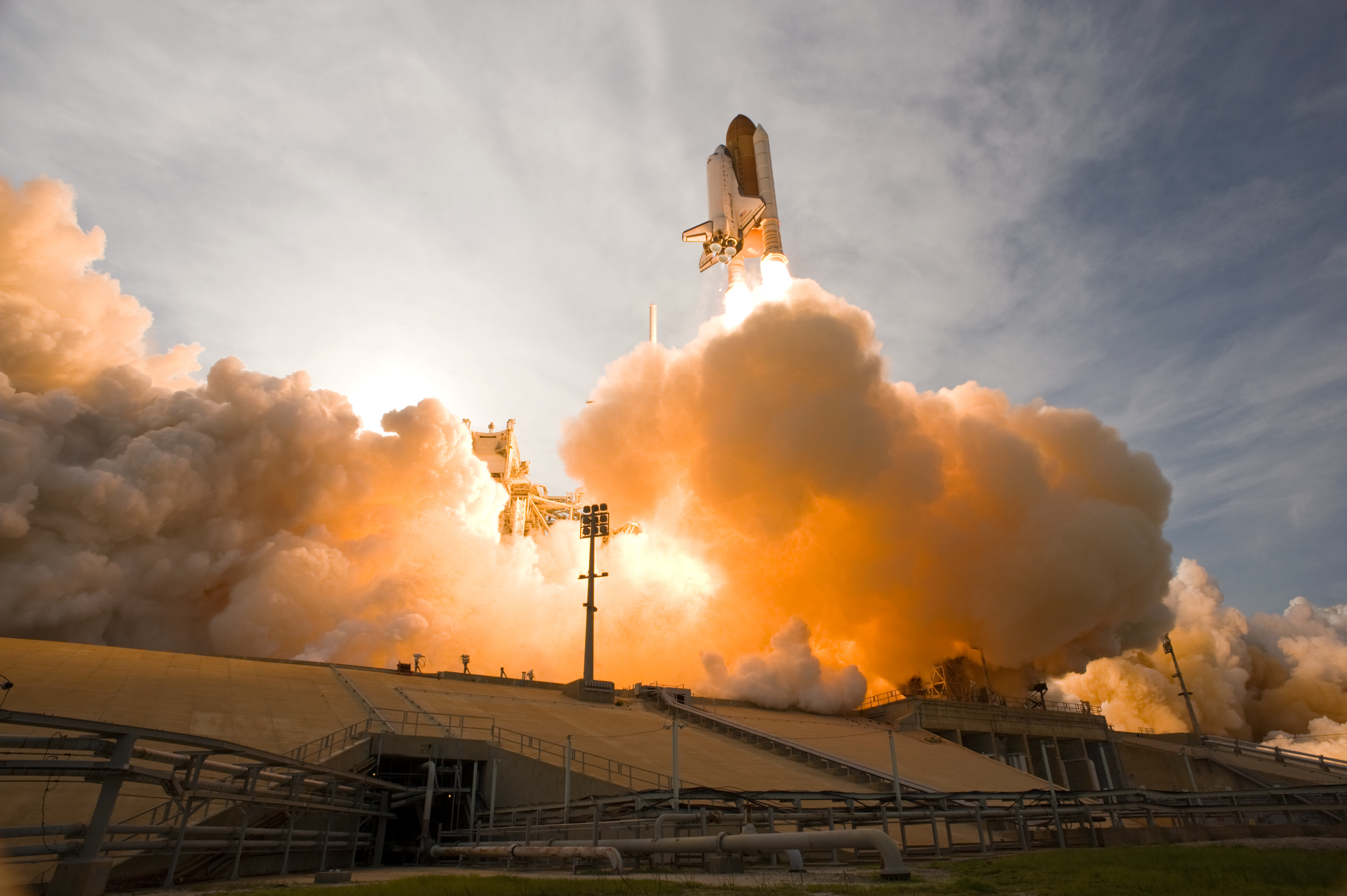
Liftoff of Space Shuttle Endeavour from Launch Pad 39A

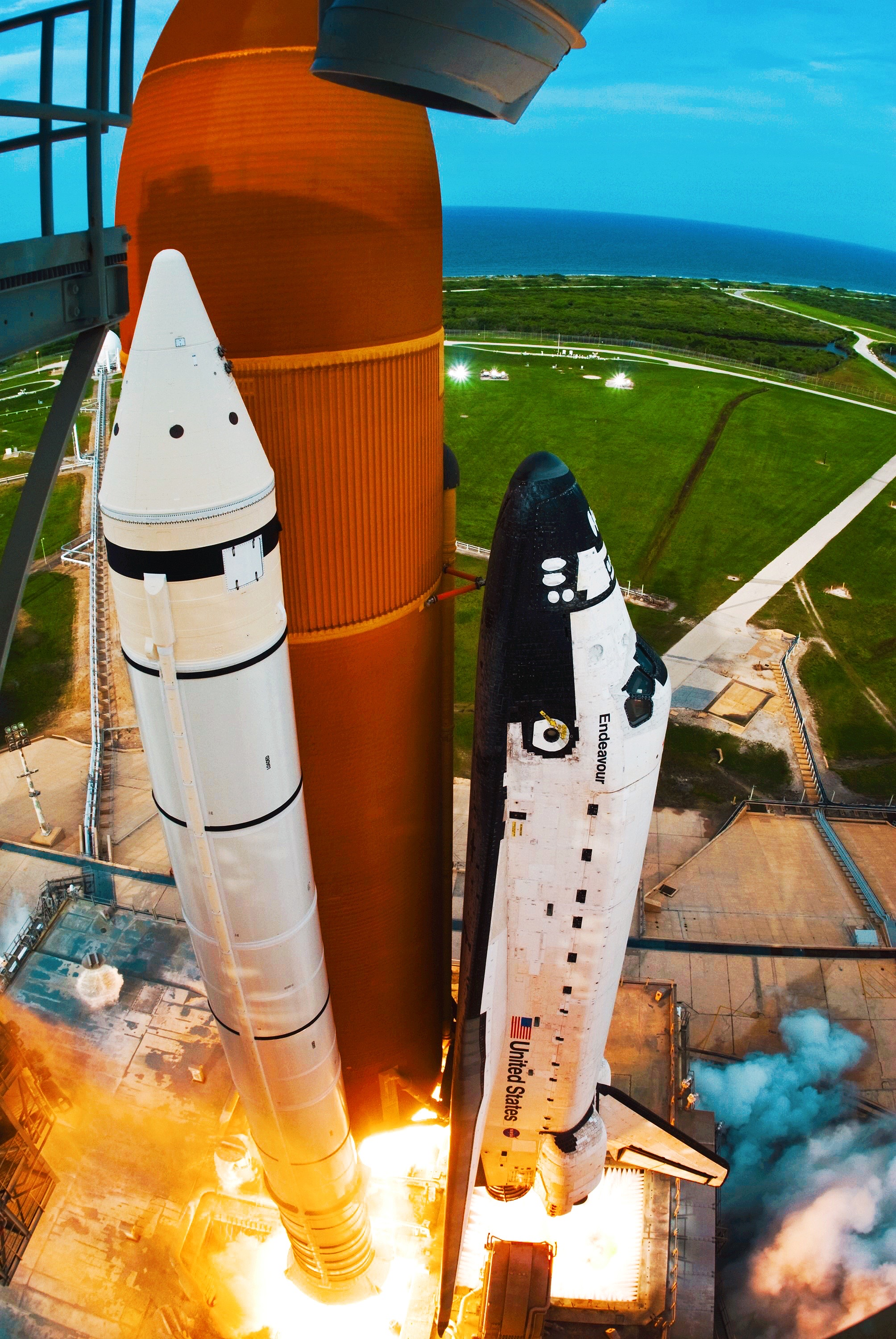
Wide angle view of Endeavour lifting off the pad

=== July 16 (Flight Day 2) ===
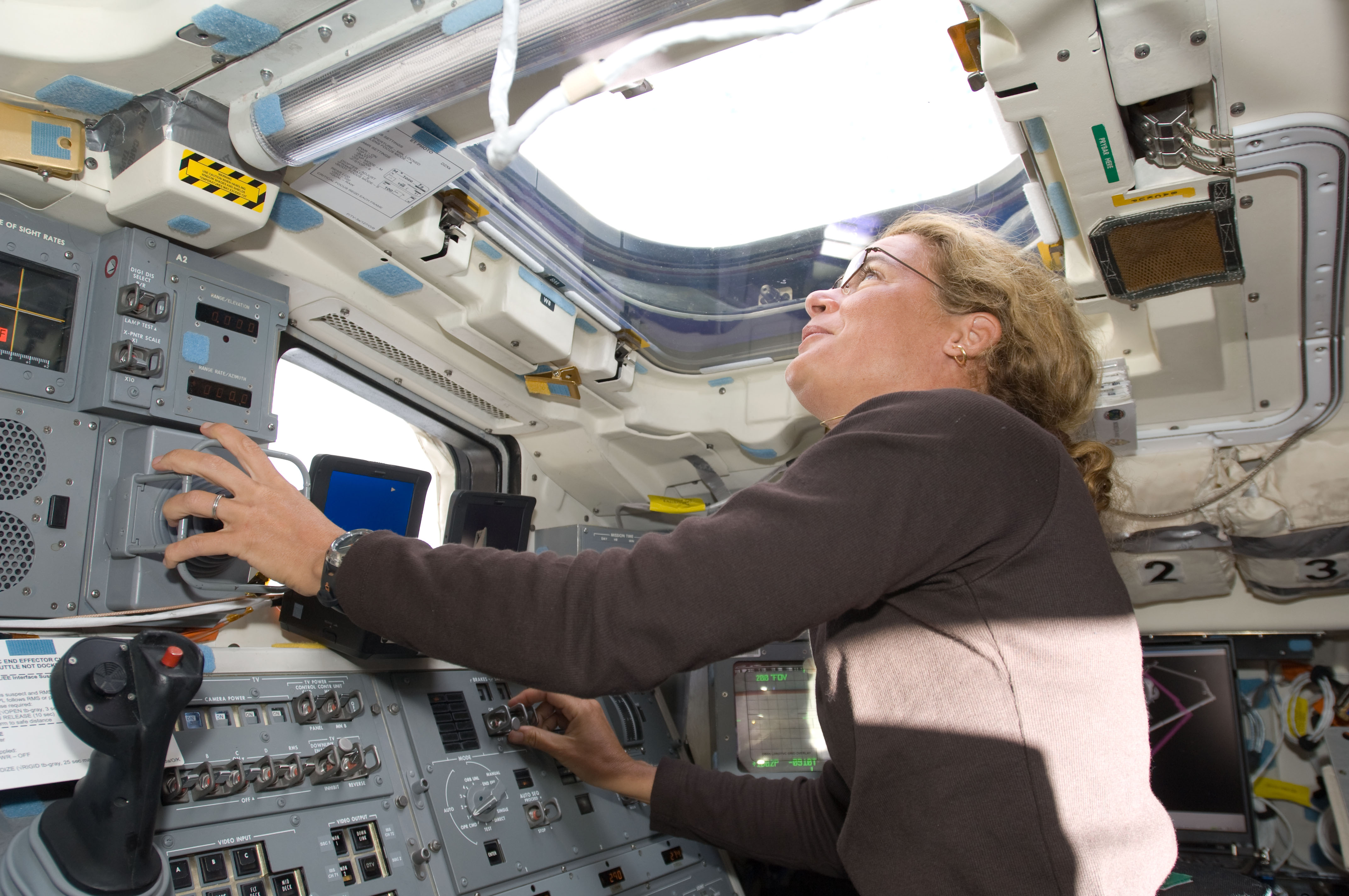
Julie Payette looks through an overhead window while operating controls on the aft flight deck of Endeavour during flight day two activities.

The thermal protection system was inspected with the Shuttle Robotic Arm/Orbiter Boom Sensor System (OBSS) and the voluminous data downlinked for analysis. The orbital maneuvering system pods were inspected for tile damage or protruding tiles. The extravehicular mobility units were checked in addition to the rendezvous system tests and centerline camera installation. In preparation for the docking, the docking ring was extended.

=== July 17 (Flight Day 3, ISS Docking) ===
The shuttle successfully docked with the station 220 miles (350 km) above the Earth, following rendezvous pitch maneuver (RPM) photography of Endeavour's thermal protection system by the Expedition 20 Crew. During this procedure, the shuttle flips over on its back to the station so that the station crew can capture high resolution imagery of the underside of the shuttle. The docking happened on the ISS's PMA-2 (Pressurized Mating Adapter) on the Harmony module and the hatch was opened after leak checks. As part of the crew swap, station crew member Koichi Wakata was replaced with Tim Kopra. The two astronauts specially fitted seatliners were interchanged. As part of preparation for EVA 1, astronauts Wolf and Kopra camped out in the Quest airlock. A quick review of the RPM imagery showed no serious concerns beyond two instances of coating loss. Further analysis of the imagery will be done. A boost of the station was completed with the shuttle's vernier thrusters to avoid a piece of space debris. The SRBs were retrieved and their camera imagery is expected to give more detail on the ET foam shedding.

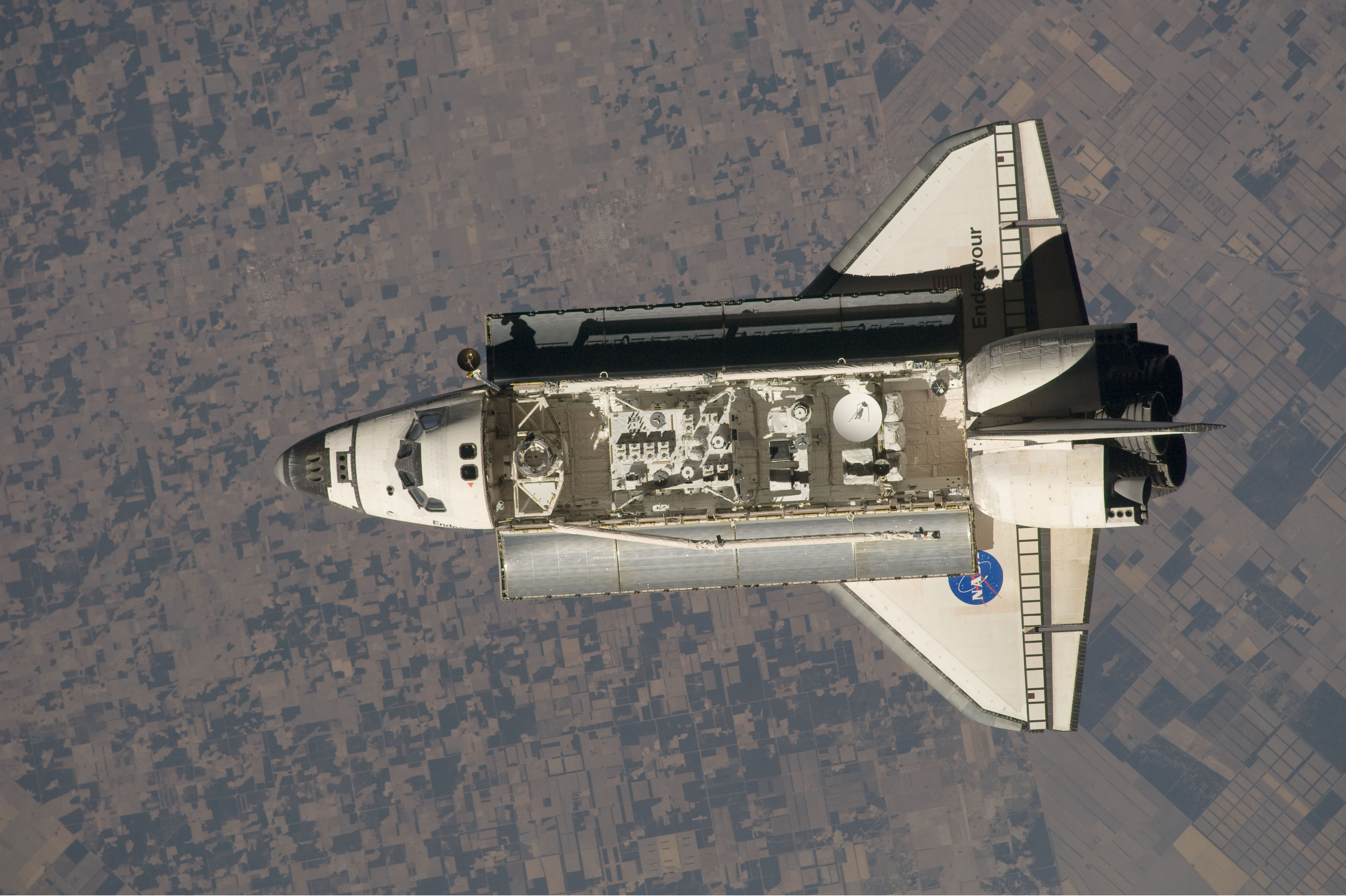
Endeavour from ISS before docking

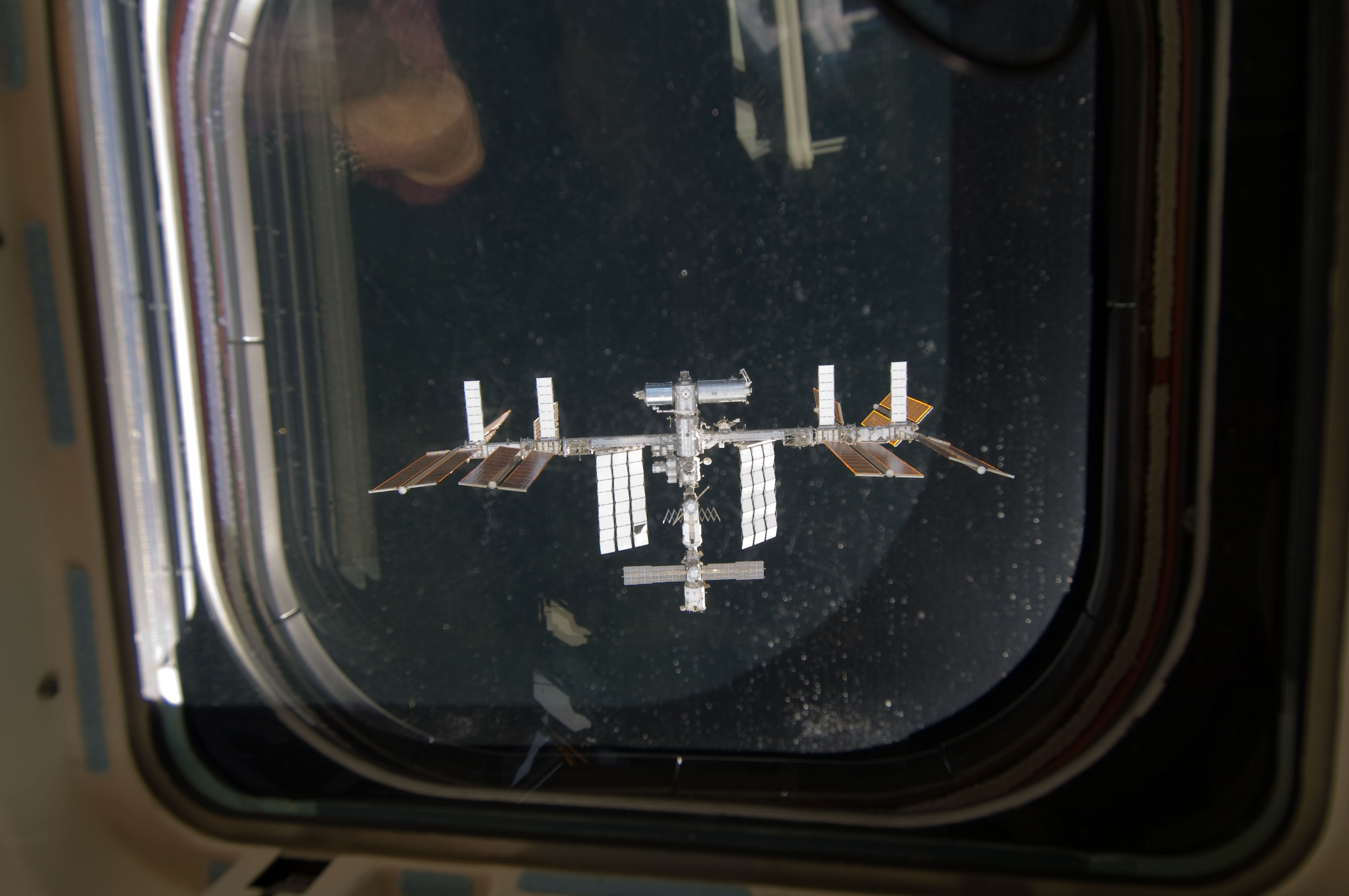
One of Endeavour's aft flight deck windows frames the nearby International Space Station.

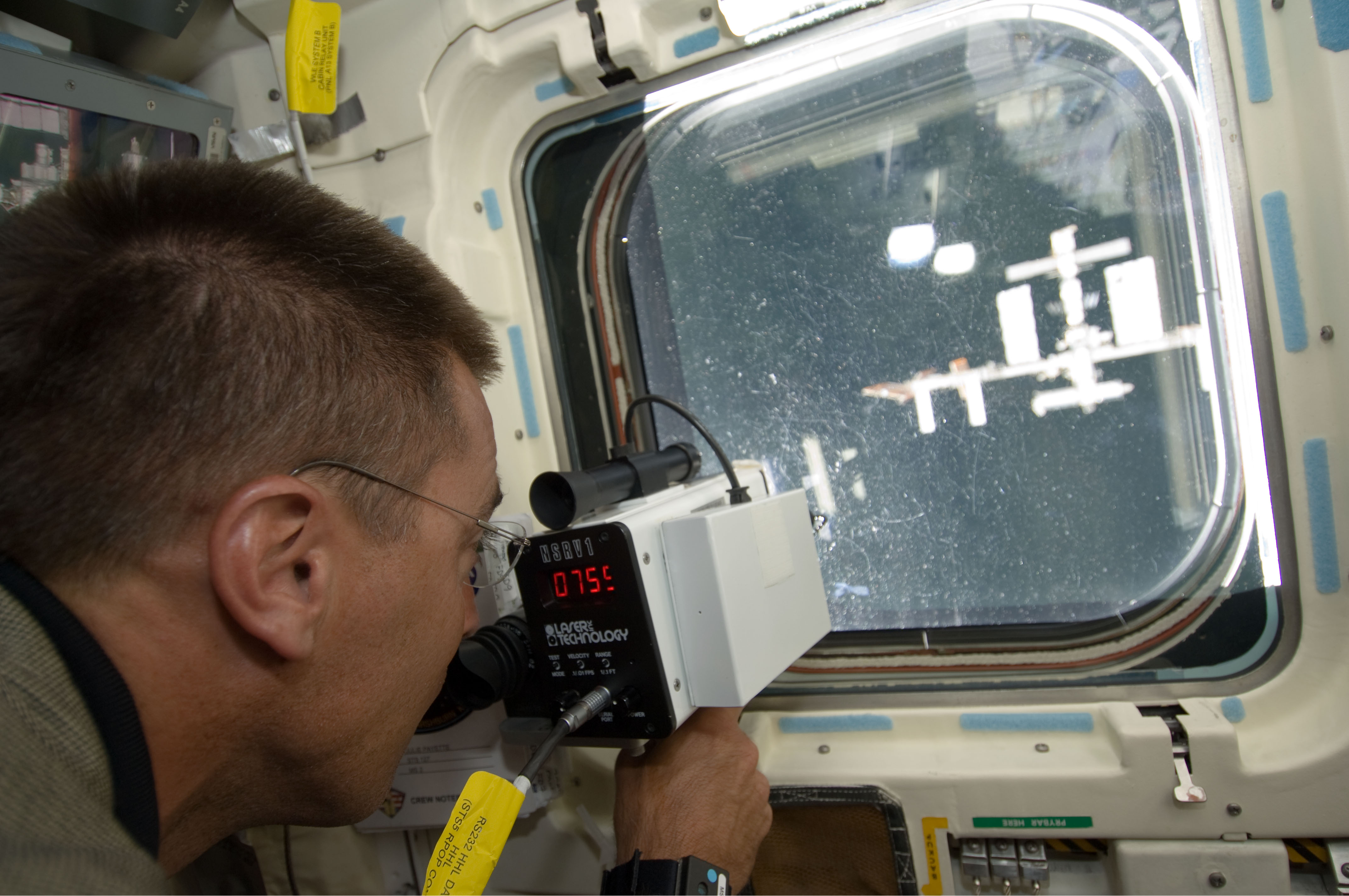
Astronaut Christopher Cassidy uses a rangefinder to determine the distance to ISS before docking

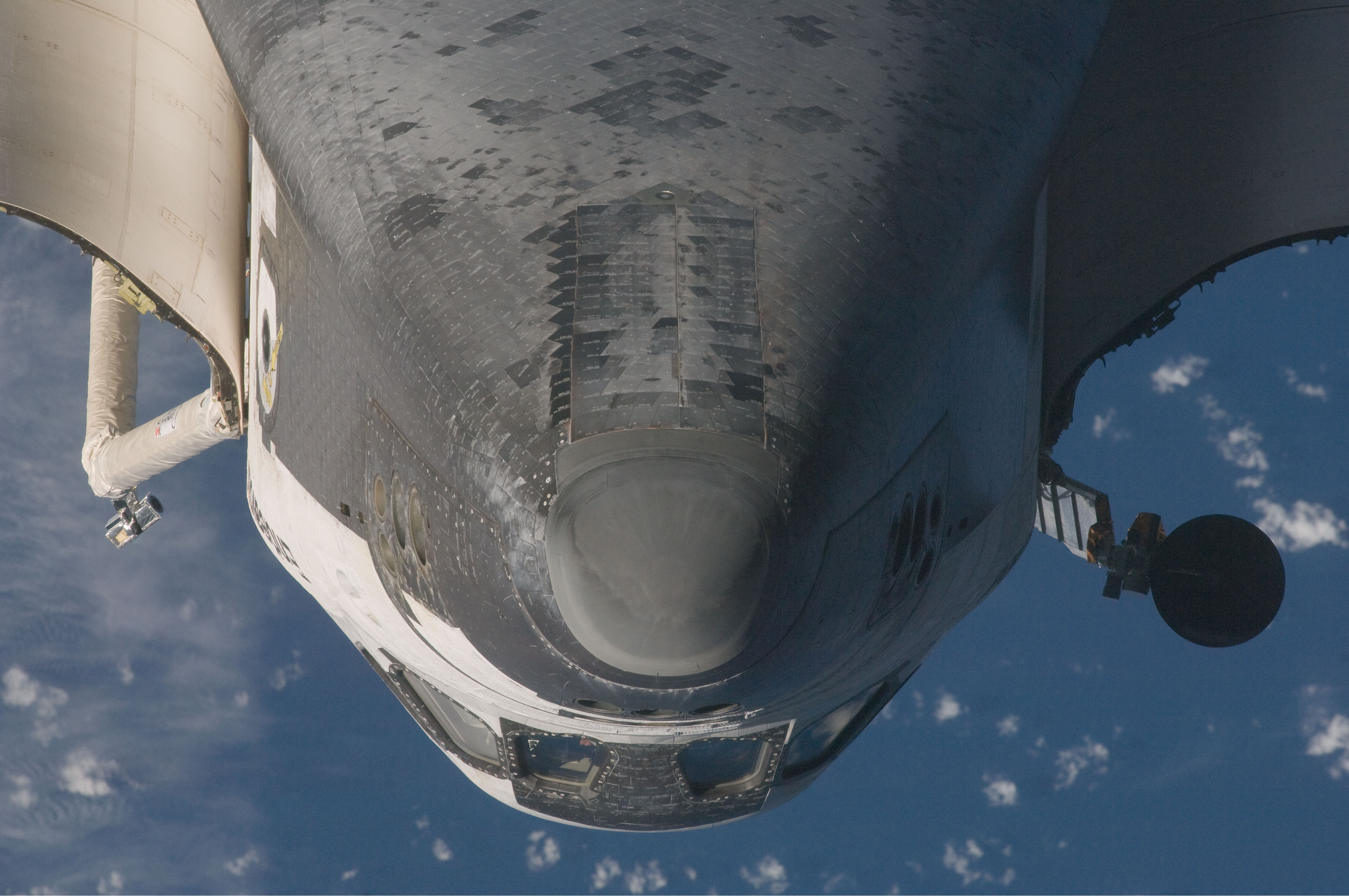
RPM image of Endeavour as taken from ISS

=== July 18 (Flight Day 4, EVA 1) ===
EVA 1 started with astronauts Dave Wolf and Tim Kopra switching their spacesuit power to internal battery at 16:19 UTC. Despite a communication problem with the spacewalkers, the Japanese Exposed Facility was successfully installed on the Japanese Experiment Module by means of a complex series of steps involving the robotic arms of both the station and the shuttle. The JEF was first unberthed from the shuttle payload bay by the station arm, after which the shuttle arm took the load. The station arm was then moved to the worksite on Node-2 (Harmony), wherefrom it took the 4.1 ton facility back. The facility was then successfully latched on to the Experiment Module. As part of the EVA, the spacewalkers successfully deployed the port Unpressurized Cargo Carrier Attach System (UCCAS), which could not be deployed during STS-119. During the prior mission, the deployment failed due to a jamming caused by a stuck detent pin. Engineers designed a custom tool to force the pin to release, which was used to deploy the mechanism. Meanwhile, the shuttle managers announced that there would be no need for a focused inspection of the heat shield. The nose cap and wing leading-edge panels of the shuttle were cleared for entry as they were, but a reentry clearance was not given. Beyond one impact site having a gouge, the rest of the impacts were found to be mostly a loss of coating. The other activity scheduled for EVA 1, the deployment of a starboard side cargo carrier, was postponed for want of time. A fuel cell issue found before launch was analyzed, though the cell continued to function as expected with no impact to the mission.

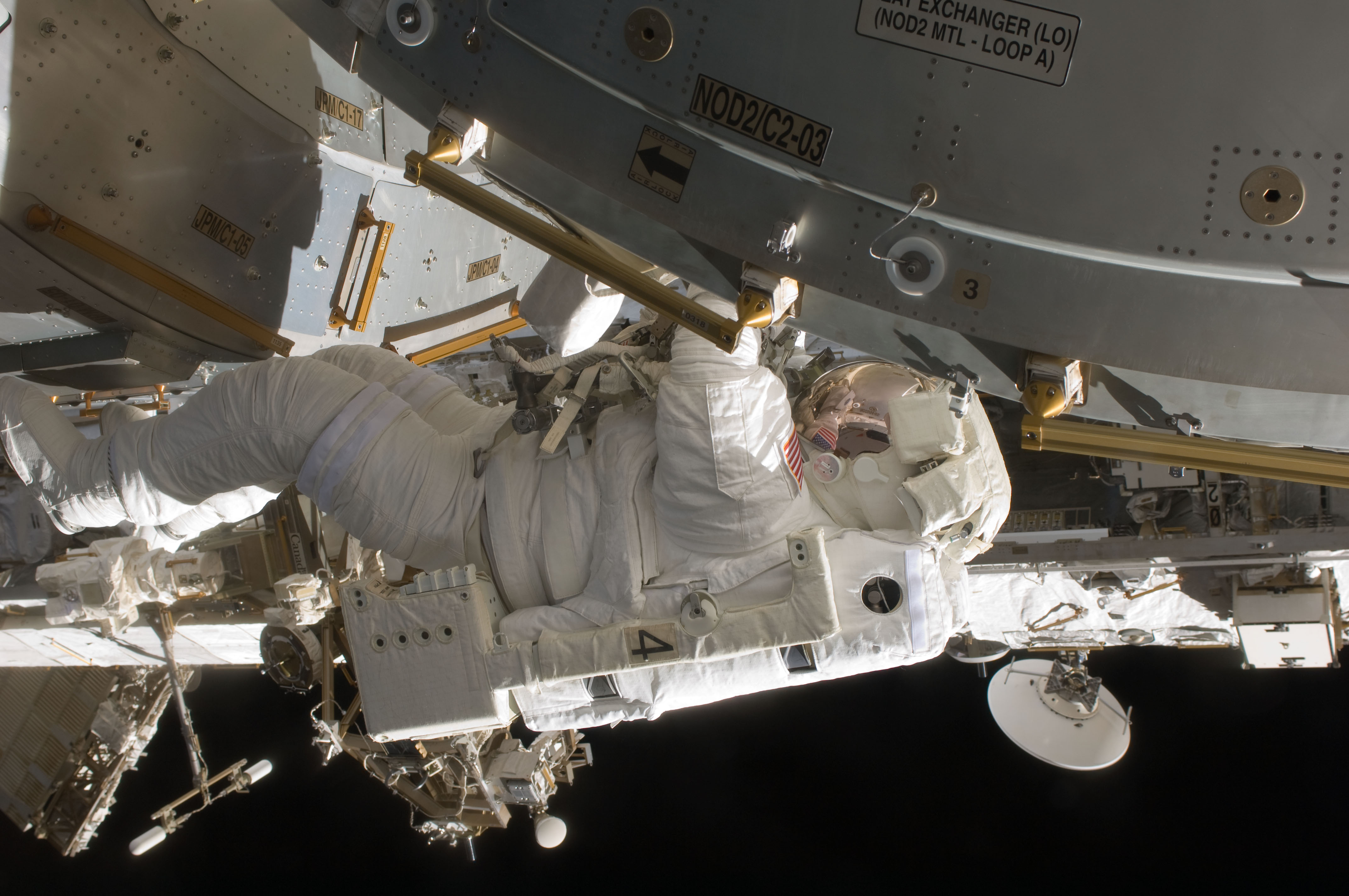
Tim Kopra working to prepare the berthing mechanisms on the Kibō laboratory and the Japanese Exposed Facility (JEF) for the JEF installation on Kibō, during space walk 1.

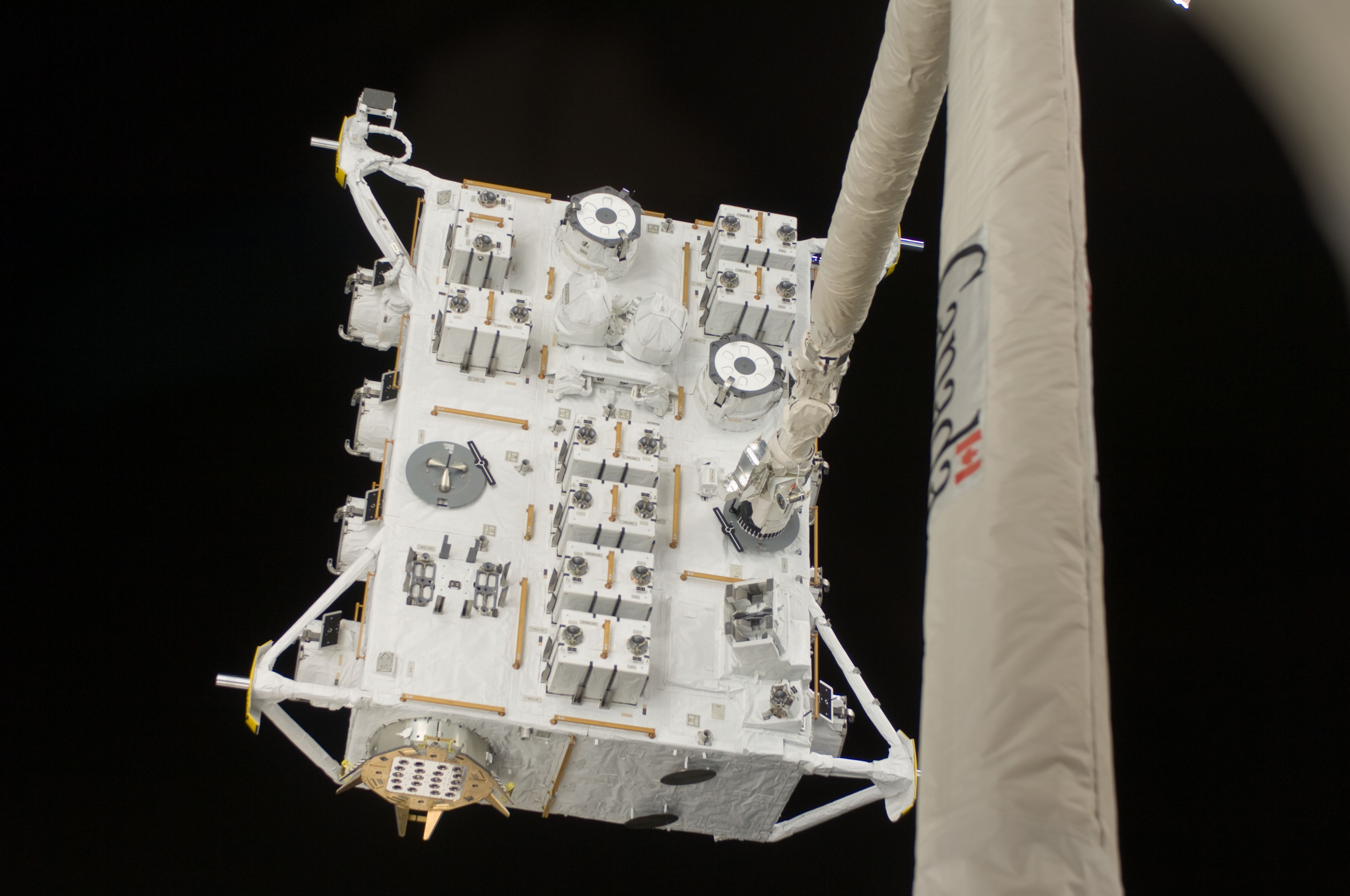
JEF in the grasp of the shuttle's robotic arm.

=== July 19 (Flight Day 5) ===
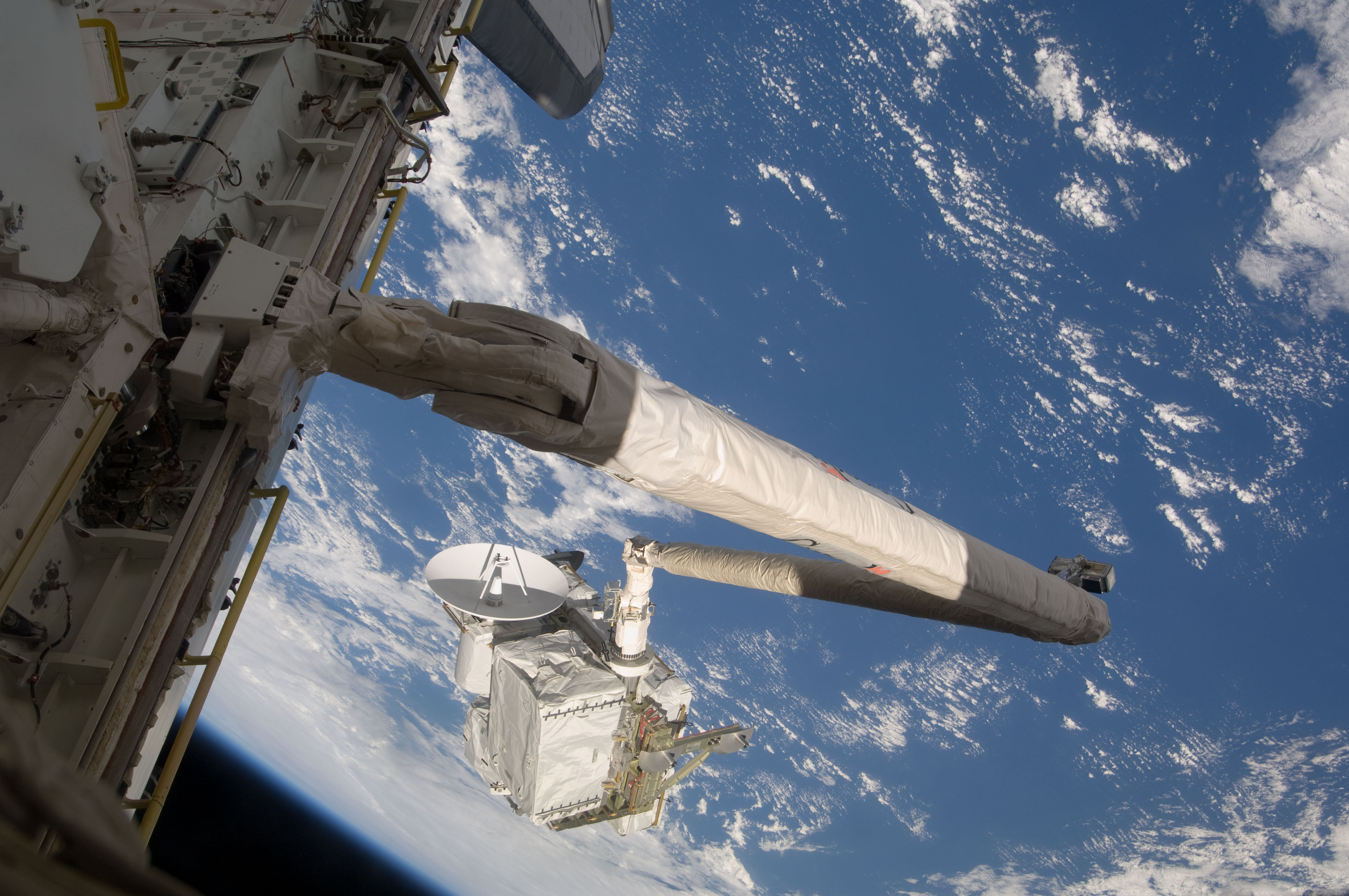
ICC handoff by shuttle's robotic arm

The installation of the Integrated Cargo Carrier-Vertical Light Deployable (ICC-VLD) on the port side of the station was successfully completed with the use of both the shuttle and station robotic arms. The cargo pallet, containing spares and fresh batteries for the station, was lifted out of the shuttle bay by the shuttle arm and handed off to the station's Canadarm2, which maneuvered it to its position. The pallet's contents will be set up in upcoming EVAs. A malfunction in a new toilet in the Destiny laboratory caused the crew to use the one in the Russian segment while attempts were made to identify the fault. Meanwhile, the shuttle was cleared for reentry.

=== July 20 (Flight Day 6, EVA 2) ===
Astronauts Wolf and Marshburn began EVA 2 at 15:27 UTC out of the Quest airlock. The EVA was to transfer the spare components brought by the shuttle from the ICC-VLD to External Stowage Platform-3. The spares were handled by Wolf riding the station's robotic arm to the P3 truss stowage platform where he and Marshburn attached them for long-term storage. The purpose of the spares was to provide redundancy to the station in the period following the shuttle's retirement. The spares unloaded include a Ku-Band Space-to-Ground antenna, a pump module for the coolant system and a drive unit for the station's robotic arm's mobile transporter. A planned installation of a camera on the Japanese Experiment Facility was postponed to a future EVA for want of time. Meanwhile, the malfunctioning toilet was set right with the replacement of internal parts and cleared for normal use after tests.

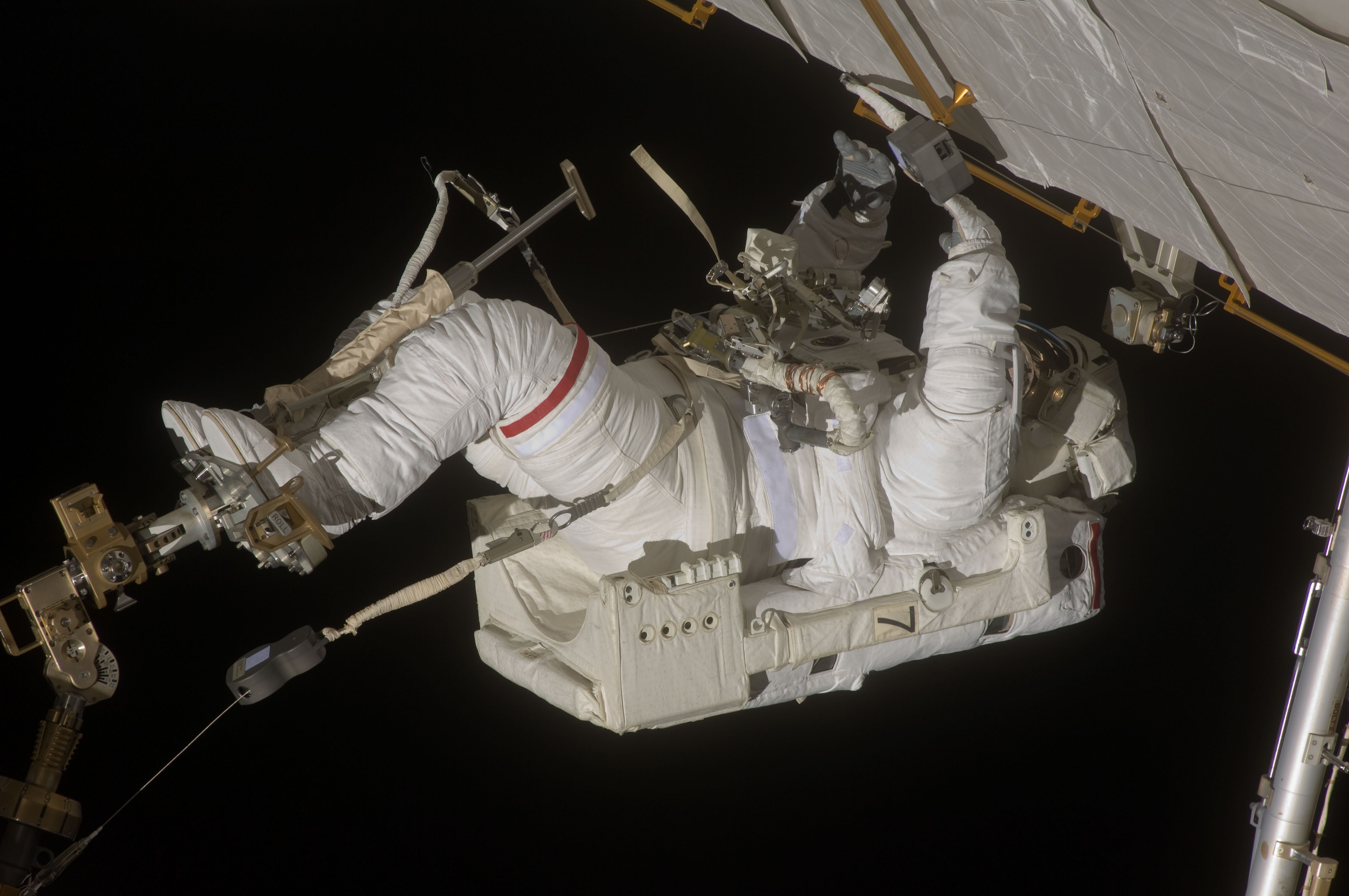
Dave Wolf performs his second space walk, which is also the second of five scheduled space walks for STS-127.

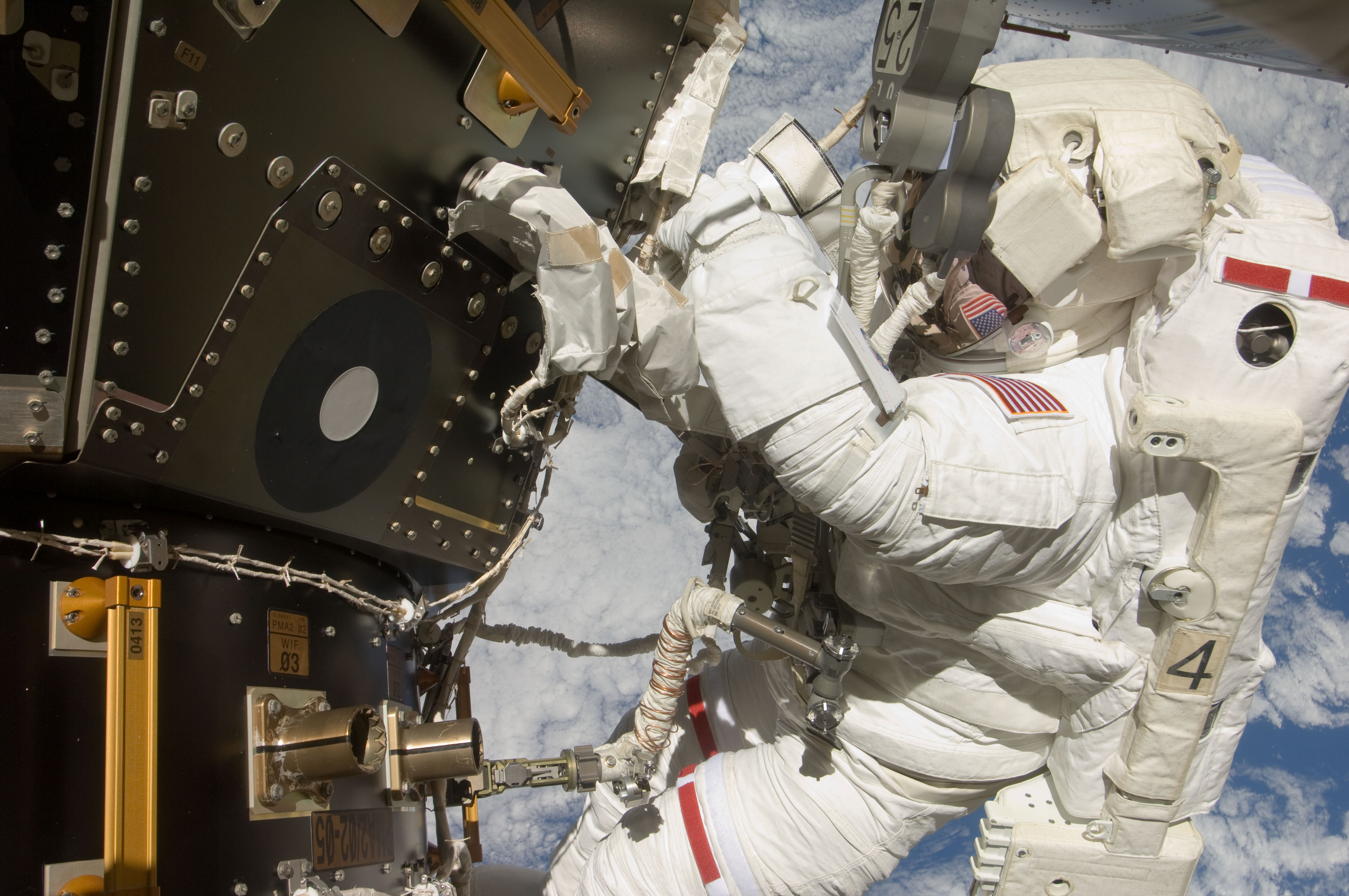
Tom Marshburn performs his first space walk, the STS-127 crew's second of the five scheduled.

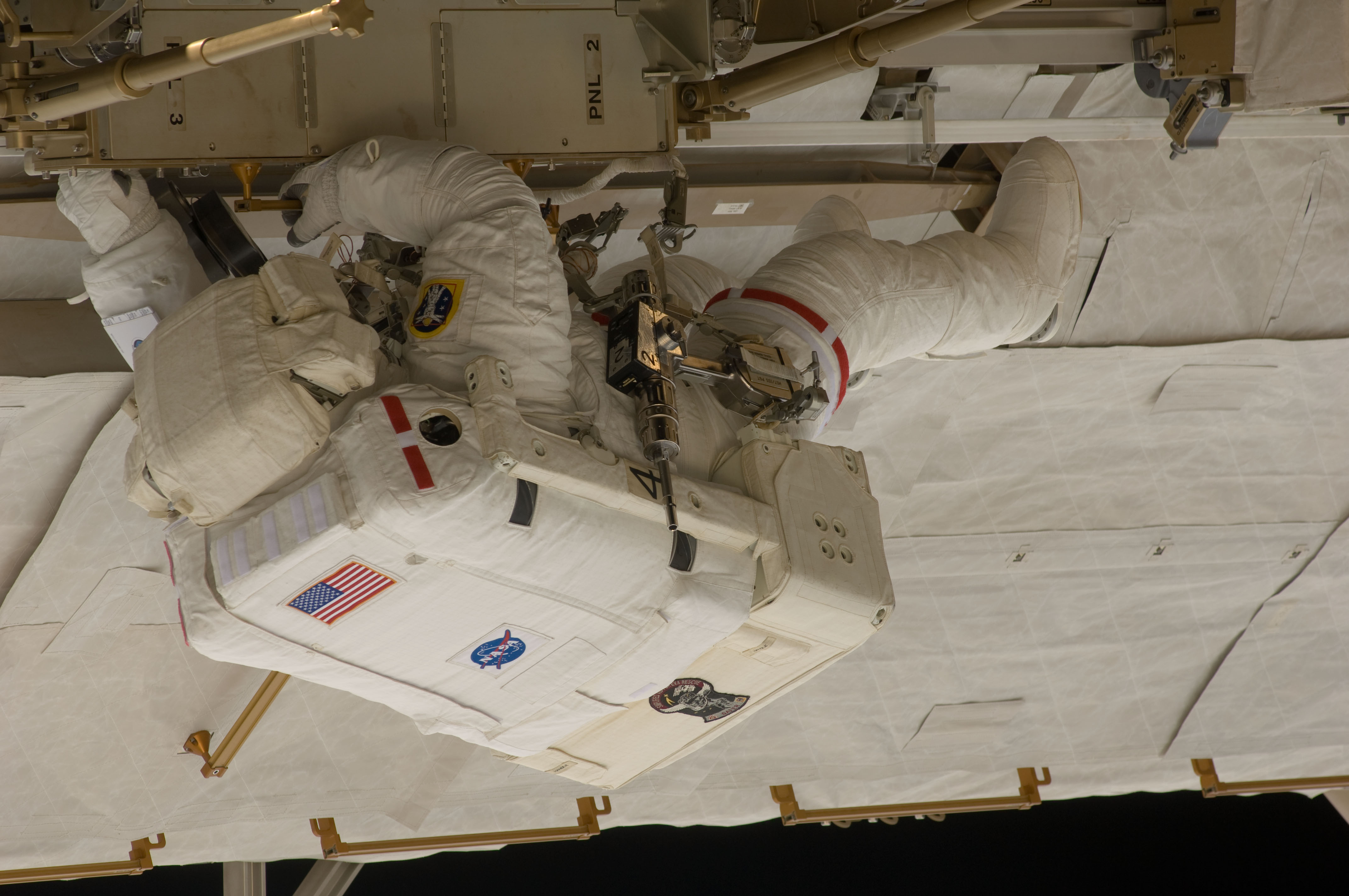
Another view of Marshburn during his first space walk.

=== July 21 (Flight Day 7) ===
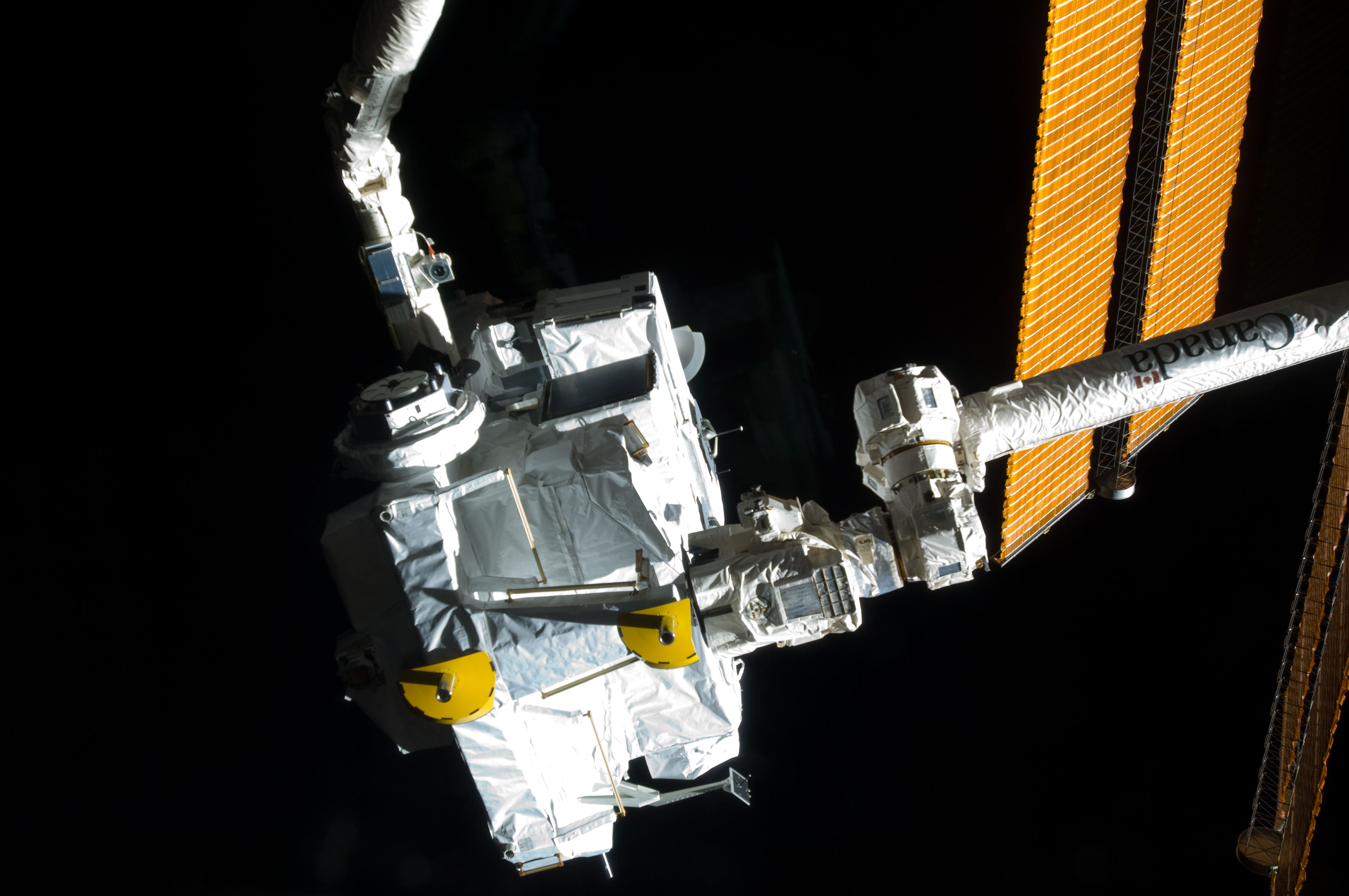
Japanese logistics carrier(JLE) handoff from shuttle to station.

In one of the more relaxed days, the Japanese logistics carrier was attached to the Japanese Exposed Facility. The cargo pallet was unberthed from the shuttle by the shuttle's robotic arm and handed to the station's robotic arm which then soft fixed it temporarily to the facility. After the experiments, containing an X-ray astronomy payload, a space environment monitor and a communications system, are installed the pallet will be returned to Earth by the shuttle.

=== July 22 (Flight Day 8, EVA 3) ===
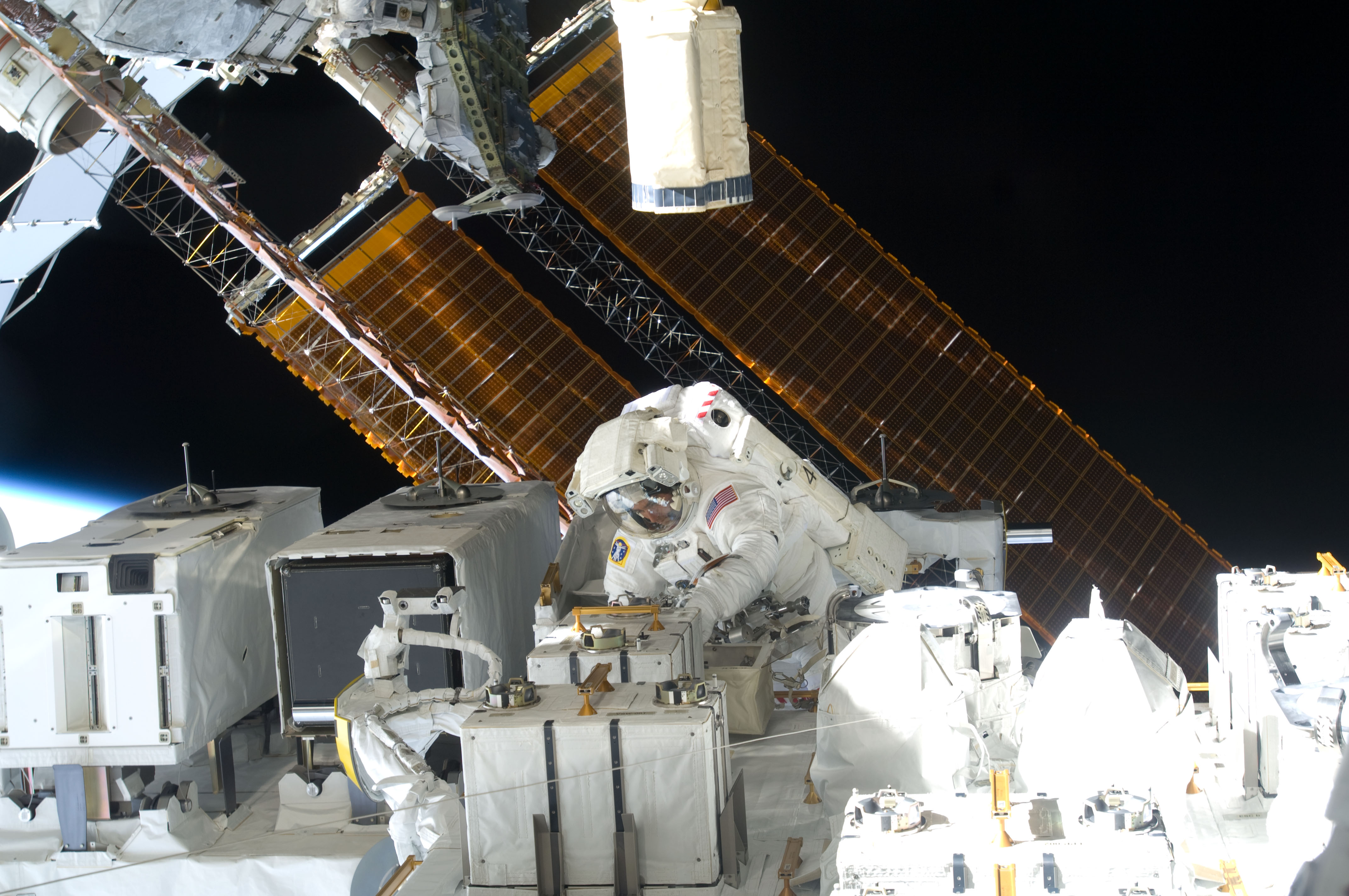
Cassidy works near the JEF during space walk 3.

The spacewalk involving astronauts Wolf and Cassidy started at 14:32 UTC. As part of preparation for experiment installation on the Japanese external science deck, Cassidy removed the thermal covers off the experiment carrier. Meanwhile, Wolf removed obstructions, consisting of a steel handrail and an equipment installation socket, from the Harmony node to clear the way for an upcoming Japanese automated resupply ship. The other task for EVA 3, involving replacement of four of the six batteries in the P6 truss, did not go as planned. Each 170 kg (375 lb) battery was to be removed and placed in a temporary stowage platform while a new one is taken from the ICC-VLD and fixed. The old ones will be returned to Earth. When two new batteries had been installed and three old ones removed, the CO_{2} levels in Cassidy's suit showed an upward trend. Even though it never exceeded the safety limits, the EVA was called off with both astronauts returning into the station. This left one old battery in a temporary flexible stowage position. The rest of the batteries will be installed in a future EVA with the rest of the EVAs being under replanning.

=== July 23 (Flight Day 9) ===
The Kibō robotic arm was inaugurated operationally with it being used to install experiments on to the Japanese exposed facility. The three experiments, transferred from the Japanese cargo pallet, consisted of Monitor of All-sky X-ray Image (MAXI), Inter-orbit Communication System (ICS) and Space Environment Data Acquisition Equipment-Attached Payload (SEDA-AP). As per the revised plan for EVA 4 astronauts Cassidy and Marshburn will replace the remaining four batteries on P6 and complete the already deferred installation of a camera on the Japanese experiment facility.

=== July 24 (Flight Day 10, EVA 4) ===
The fourth spacewalk, by Cassidy and Marshburn, involved replacement of the final four of the six batteries on P6 truss integrated electronics assembly. After berthing the old batteries in the ICC-VLD, the cargo pallet was returned to the Endeavour's payload bay by the shuttle's robotic arm. The elevated levels of CO_{2} in Cassidy's suit during EVA 3 was attributed to the astronaut working at a fast pace.

=== July 25 (Flight Day 11) ===
The crew of both the shuttle and station had a day off. The day was uneventful except for the station's American CO_{2} removal system shutting down without any immediate impact.

=== July 26 (Flight Day 12) ===
The Japanese Exposed Section cargo carrier was berthed in Endeavour's payload bay by the shuttle's robotic arm after it was handed the pallet by the station's robotic arm. After this the crew of both the station and the shuttle held a joint news conference. Meanwhile, the malfunctioning American CO_{2} removal system has been transitioned to manual mode in order to keep it running.

=== July 27 (Flight Day 13, EVA 5) ===
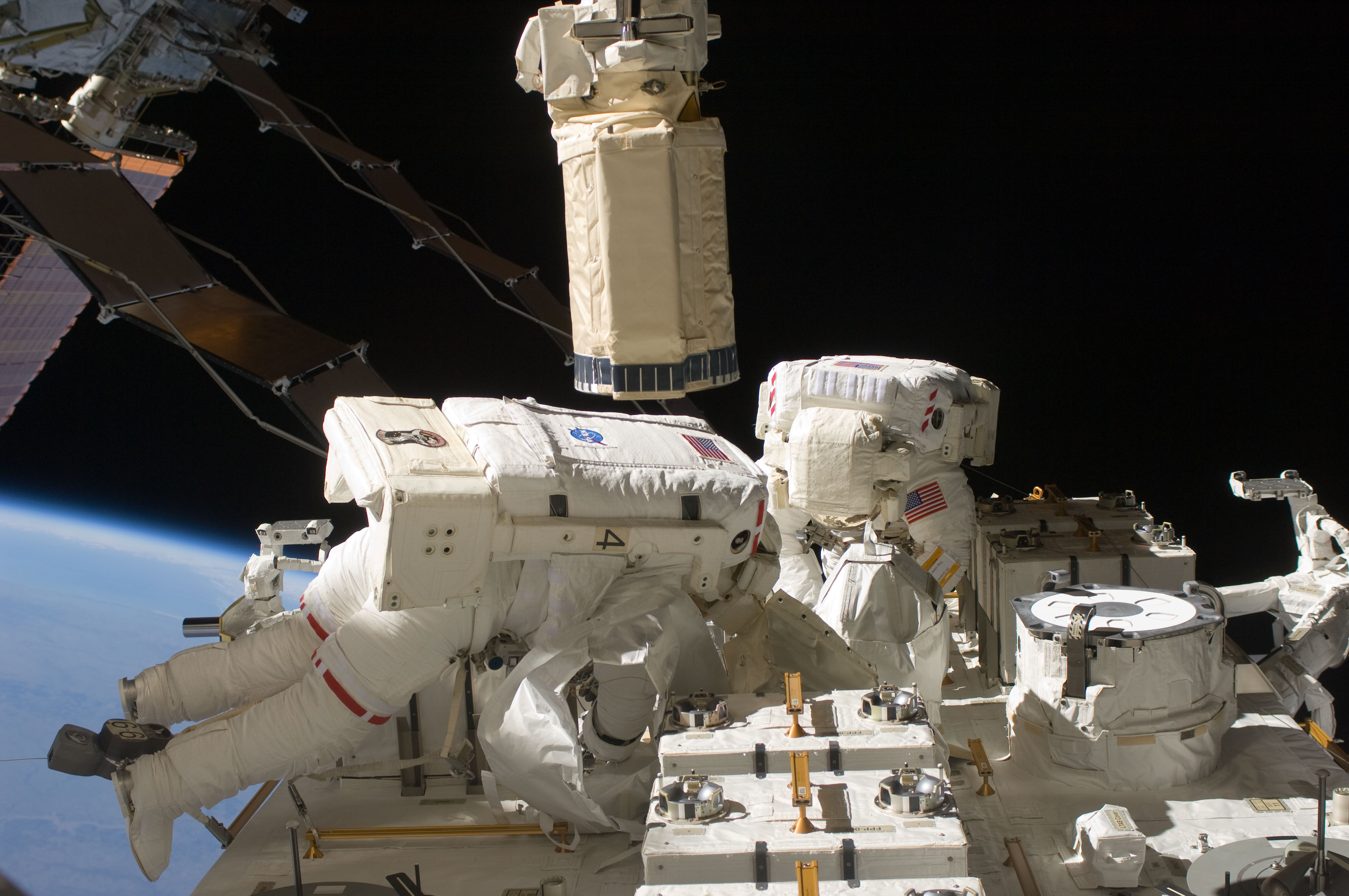
Marshburn and Cassidy during space walk 5

Cassidy and Marshburn started EVA 5 at 11:33 UTC when they switched their suit power to internal battery. For this spacewalk, the CO_{2} absorbent system in the suits were changed from Lithium Hydroxide to METOX due to problems with Cassidy's usage. Cassidy completed the reconfiguring of power channels in the Zenith 1 patch panel which are used for the control moment gyroscopes. Before the rewiring, two of the gyroscopes were fed by the same power channel. Since a failure of the channel can knock down two gyros and put the station in a degraded position the reconfiguration was made necessary. This rewiring made the two gyros to operate from separate power channels. Meanwhile, Marshburn secured some multi-layered insulation on the Dextre. Later both the spacewalkers installed video cameras on the front and back of the Japanese exposed facility which will be used in dockings of the Japanese cargo crafts and normal operation. The cameras flew up in launch configuration and now have been installed in an operational configuration, thus completing the JEF assembly. Meanwhile, due to Cassidy's METOX limitation, the deployment of the PAS was deferred to a future spacewalk. Instead some get ahead tasks were completed which included installation of handrails and a portable foot restraint.

=== July 28 (Flight Day 14, ISS Undocking) ===
After a crew farewell Endeavour undocked from the ISS at 17:26 UTC. Unlike most other launches, hatch closure, which happened at 15:08 UTC, and undocking happened on the same day due to the extended delay in launching and the arrival of the Progress 34 cargo craft. After undocking Hurley began a fly around of the station giving the shuttle crew an opportunity to photograph the station's current configuration in all directions. Then a final separation burn was completed at 3:09 pm EDT.

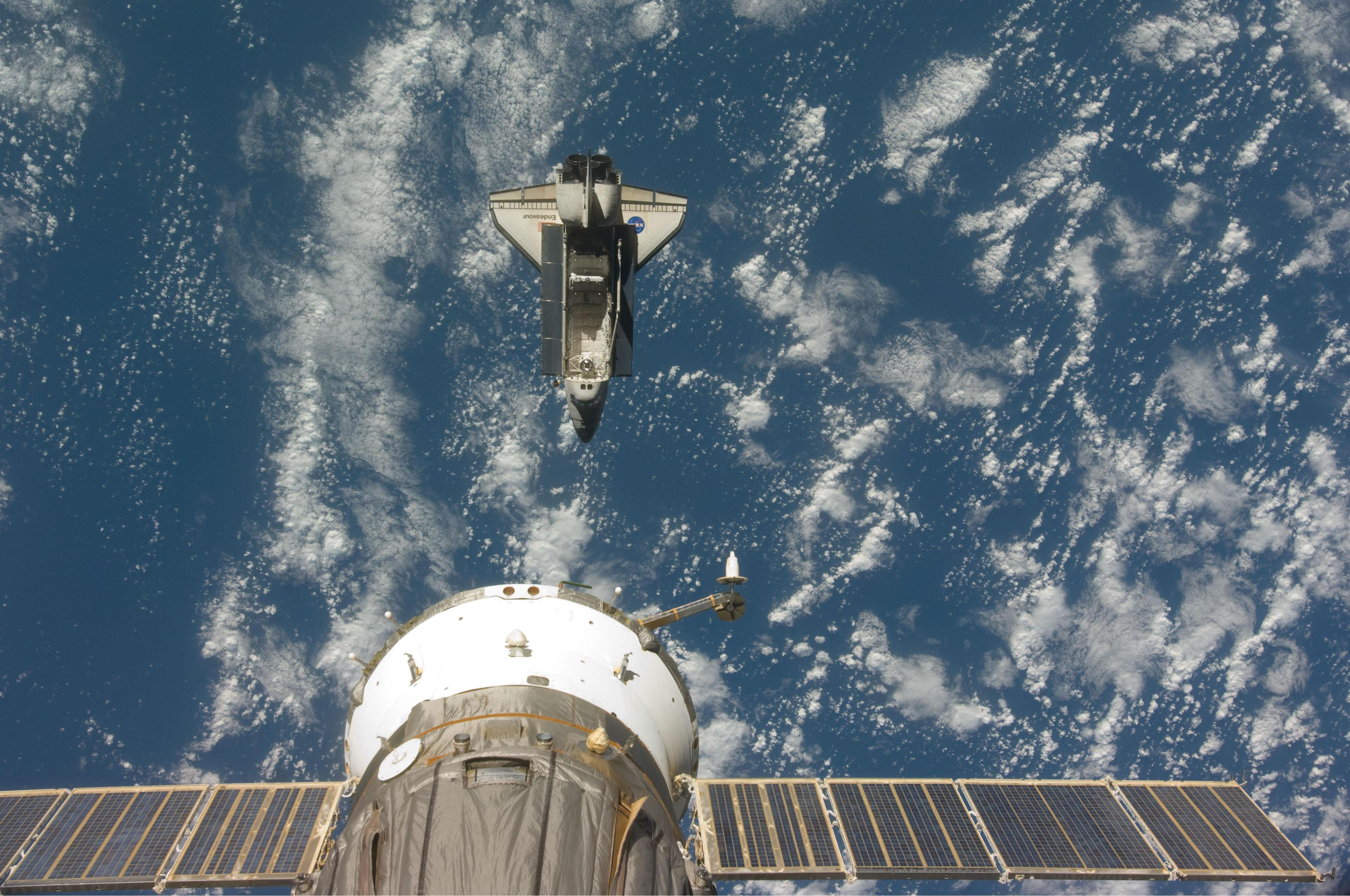
Endeavour shortly after the shuttle and station post-undocking separation.

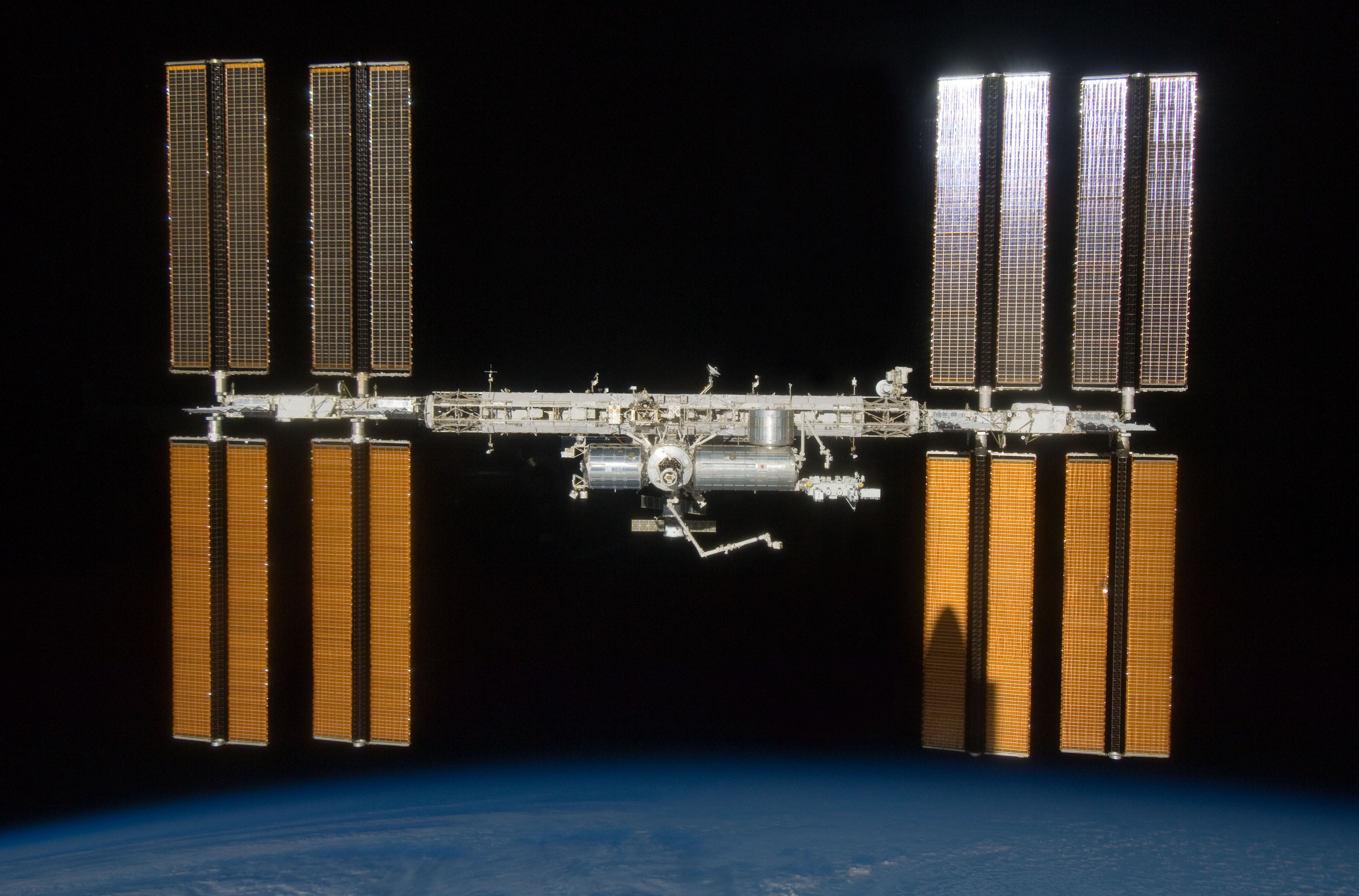
ISS shortly after the shuttle and station post-undocking separation with the JEF prominently seen.

=== July 29 (Flight Day 15) ===
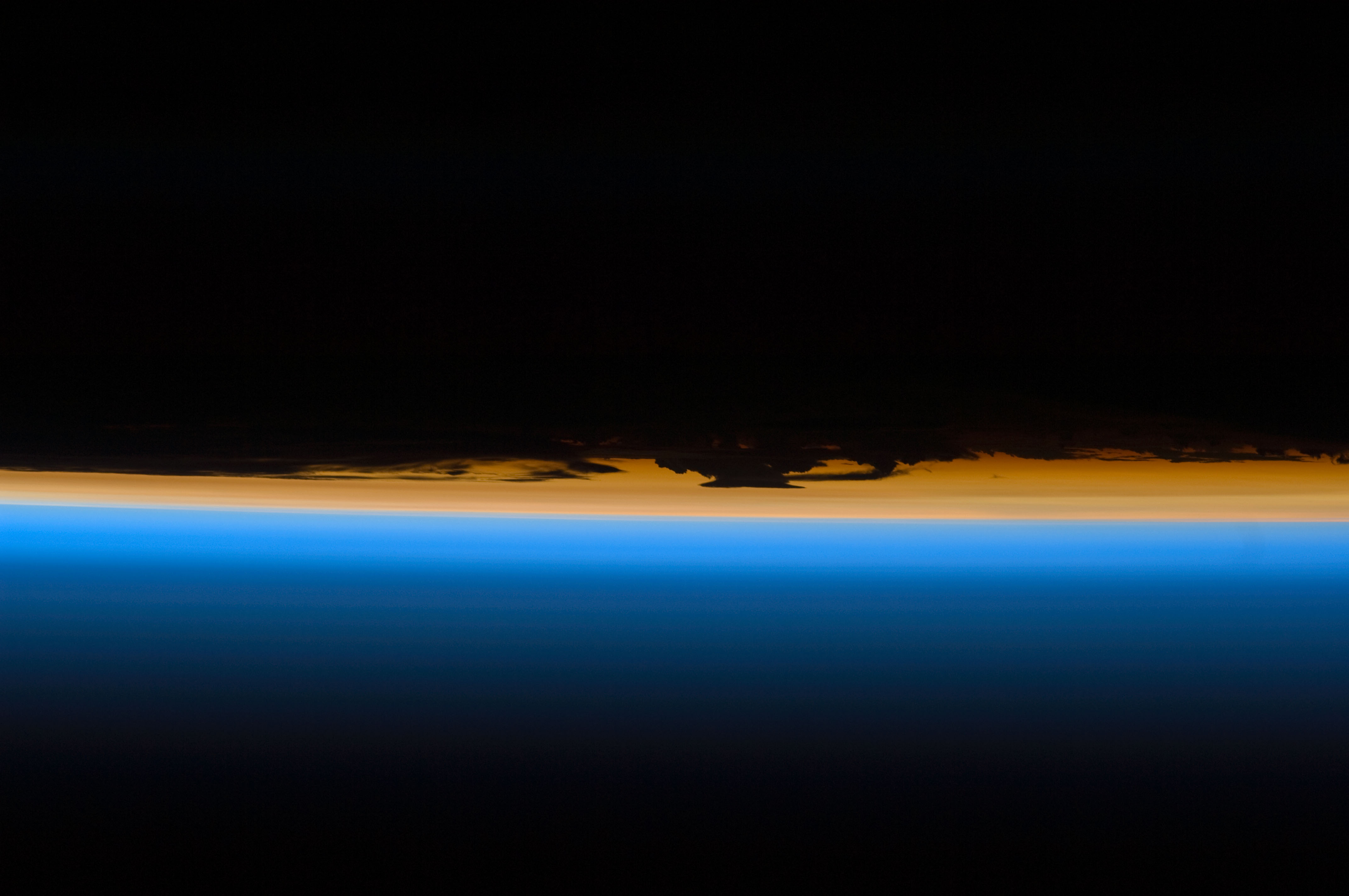
Image of orbital sunset taken from Endeavour one day before the shuttle landed

The OBSS was grappled by the shuttle's robotic arm and used to inspect Endeavour's thermal protection system for damage from orbital debris. The imagery will be analyzed to clear the shuttle for reentry. Meanwhile, the foam loss on the external tank was initially attributed to substrate contamination ahead of the application of the foam. Later during the processing of STS-128, voids in the foam was highlighted as a trigger for the shedding. The air trapped in the voids could have expanded due to the high temperatures generated during ascent thus breaking the foam.

=== July 30 (Flight Day 16) ===
The crew checked out the shuttle's systems for the landing, and successfully deployed the DRAGONSat and ANDE-2 satellites. The shuttle was cleared for reentry, with the TPS imagery showing no concerns. The shuttle tracked two chances of landing at KSC on July 31, and could land no later due to its limited carbon dioxide-scrubbing LiOH supply.

=== July 31 (Flight Day 17, Landing) ===
After a 16-day mission, Endeavour landed successfully at Kennedy Space Center at 10:48 EDT on July 31, 2009. The landing had to be undertaken before August 1, due to CO_{2}-scrubbing lithium hydroxide limitations. There were two opportunities to land on July 31, of which the first was ultimately utilized.

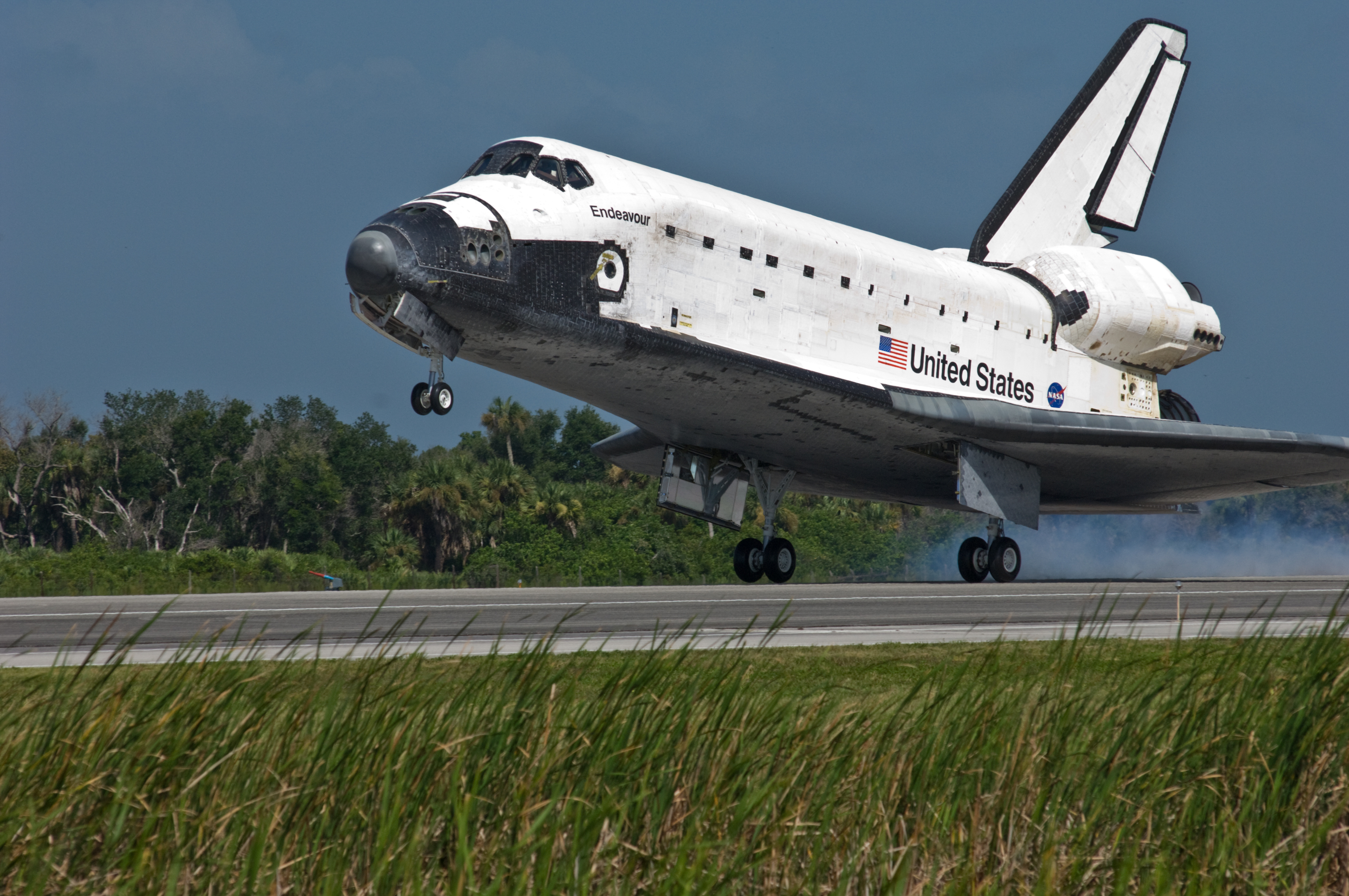
Endeavour touches down at Kennedy Space Center.

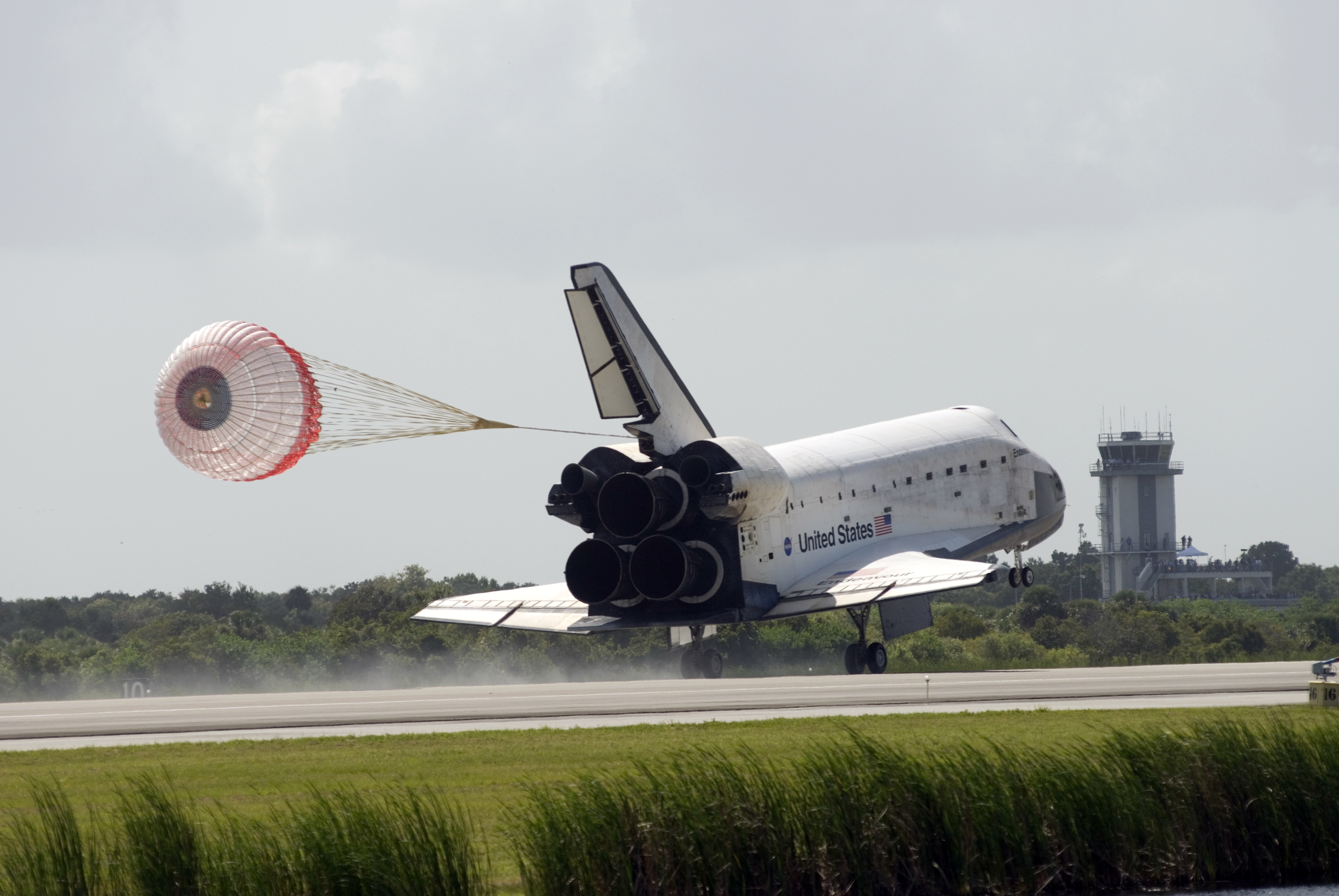
Endeavour deploys its drag chute to aid deceleration.

== EVAs ==
Five spacewalks were conducted during STS-127.

EVA	Spacewalkers	Start (UTC)	End (UTC)	Duration
EVA 1	David A. Wolf; Timothy Kopra	July 18, 2009; 16:19	July 18, 2009; 20:51	5 hours, 32 minutes
EVA 1	JEF installed and P3 Nadir Unpressurized Cargo Carrier Attach System deployed. The S3 Zenith Outboard Payload Attachment System deployment was postponed due to time constraints.			
EVA 2	Wolf; Thomas H. Marshburn	July 20, 2009; 15:27	July 20, 2009; 22:20	6 hours, 53 minutes
EVA 2	Transferred Orbital Replacement Units (ORUs) from the Shuttle Integrated Cargo Carrier (ICC) to the External Stowage Platform-3 (ESP3). Transferred materials included a spare high-gain antenna, cooling-system pump module and spare parts for the Mobile Servicing System. The JEF Visual Equipment (JEF-VE) installation on the forward section was postponed due to time constraints.			
EVA 3	Wolf; Christopher J. Cassidy	July 22, 2009; 14:32	July 22, 2009; 20:31	5 hours, 59 minutes
EVA 3	JPM preparation work, ICS-EF MLI, and P6 battery replacement (2 of 6 units). EVA was cut short due to high levels of CO_{2} in Cassidy's suit.			
EVA 4	Cassidy; Marshburn	July 24, 2009; 13:54	July 24, 2009; 21:06	7 hours, 12 minutes
EVA 4	P6 battery replacement (final 4 of 6).			
EVA 5	Cassidy; Marshburn	July 27, 2009; 11:33	July 27, 2009; 16:27	4 hours, 54 minutes
EVA 5	SPDM thermal cover adjustment, Z1 patch panel reconfiguration, JEM visual equipment (JEM-VE) installation (forward and aft), and JEM-LTA reconfigurations. The S3 Nadir Payload Attachment System (outboard) deployment was postponed to a later mission.			

== Wake-up calls ==
NASA began a tradition of playing music to astronauts during the Gemini program, and first used music to wake up a flight crew during Apollo 15. Each track is specially chosen, often by the astronauts' families, and usually has a special meaning to an individual member of the crew, or is applicable to their daily activities.

Flight Day	Song	Artist	Played for	Links
Day 2	"These Are Days"	10,000 Maniacs	Timothy Kopra	WAV MP3; TRANSCRIPT
Day 3	"Here Comes the Sun"	The Beatles	Mark Polansky	WAV MP3; TRANSCRIPT
Day 4	"Home"	Marc Broussard	David Wolf	WAV MP3; TRANSCRIPT
Day 5	"Learning to Fly"	Tom Petty	Christopher Cassidy	WAV MP3; TRANSCRIPT
Day 6	"Thunderbirds March"	Barry Gray	Julie Payette	WAV MP3; TRANSCRIPT
Day 7	"Life Is a Highway"	Rascal Flatts	Tom Marshburn	WAV MP3; TRANSCRIPT
Day 8	"Santa Monica"	Everclear	Douglas Hurley	WAV MP3; TRANSCRIPT
Day 9	"Tiny Dancer"	Elton John	Mark Polansky	WAV MP3; TRANSCRIPT
Day 10	"Wish You Were Here"	Pink Floyd	David Wolf	WAV MP3; TRANSCRIPT
Day 11	"In Your Eyes"	Peter Gabriel	Tom Marshburn	WAV MP3; TRANSCRIPT
Day 12	"Dixit Dominus"	George Frederic Handel	Julie Payette	WAV MP3; TRANSCRIPT
Day 13	"On the Sunny Side of the Street"	Steve Tyrell	Mark Polansky	WAV MP3; TRANSCRIPT
Day 14	"God Bless the U.S.A."	Lee Greenwood	Chris Cassidy	WAV MP3; TRANSCRIPT
Day 15	"Yellow"	Coldplay	Doug Hurley	WAV MP3; TRANSCRIPT
Day 16	"I Got You Babe"	Sonny & Cher	Koichi Wakata	WAV MP3; TRANSCRIPT
Day 17	"Beautiful Day"	U2	Tom Marshburn	WAV MP3; TRANSCRIPT

== See also ==
- 2009 in spaceflight
- List of human spaceflights
- List of International Space Station spacewalks
- List of Space Shuttle missions
- List of spacewalks 2000–2014

== Media ==
Space Shuttle Endeavour launches from Launch Pad 39A at Kennedy Space Center as part of the STS-127 mission

Space Shuttle Endeavour landing
