= JPMorgan India Growth & Income =

British investment trust

- Type: Public company
- Traded as: LSE: JIGI
- ISIN: GB0003450359
- Industry: Investment trust
- Founded: 1994; 32 years ago
- Headquarters: 25 Bank Street, Canary Wharf, London, England
- Key people: Jeremy Whitley (Chairman)

JPMorgan India Growth & Income (LSE: JIGI) is a large British investment trust dedicated to investments in India. Established in 1994, the company is listed on the London Stock Exchange. The chairman is Jeremy Whitley.

== History ==
The company was established as the Fleming Indian Investment Trust under the management of Robert Fleming & Co. in 1994. After Robert Fleming & Co. was acquired by Chase Manhattan in April 2000, and Chase Manhattan merged with J.P. Morgan & Co. in December 2000, it was brought under the management of J.P. Morgan & Co. It became the JP Morgan Fleming Indian Investment Trust in 2002 and then, following JPMorgan's decision to drop the Fleming brand, it adopted the name JPMorgan Indian Investment Trust in 2005. The company announced a return of capital of £195 million to shareholders in January 2020. It changed its name to JPMorgan India Growth & Income in October 2025.
