= Allard J2X =

The Allard J2X name was used on several cars produced by Allard:

- The first Allard J2X (produced between 1952 and 1954) was a replacement for the original Allard J2. Starting in 2018 a British company has restarted production of the original Allard J2X.
- Allard J2X-C, a Group C sports racing car that was used in 1992 and 1993.
- Allard J2X2, a replica of the original Allard J2 built in Canada.
