= Paul W. Richards =

American astronaut and engineer (born 1964)

Paul Richards
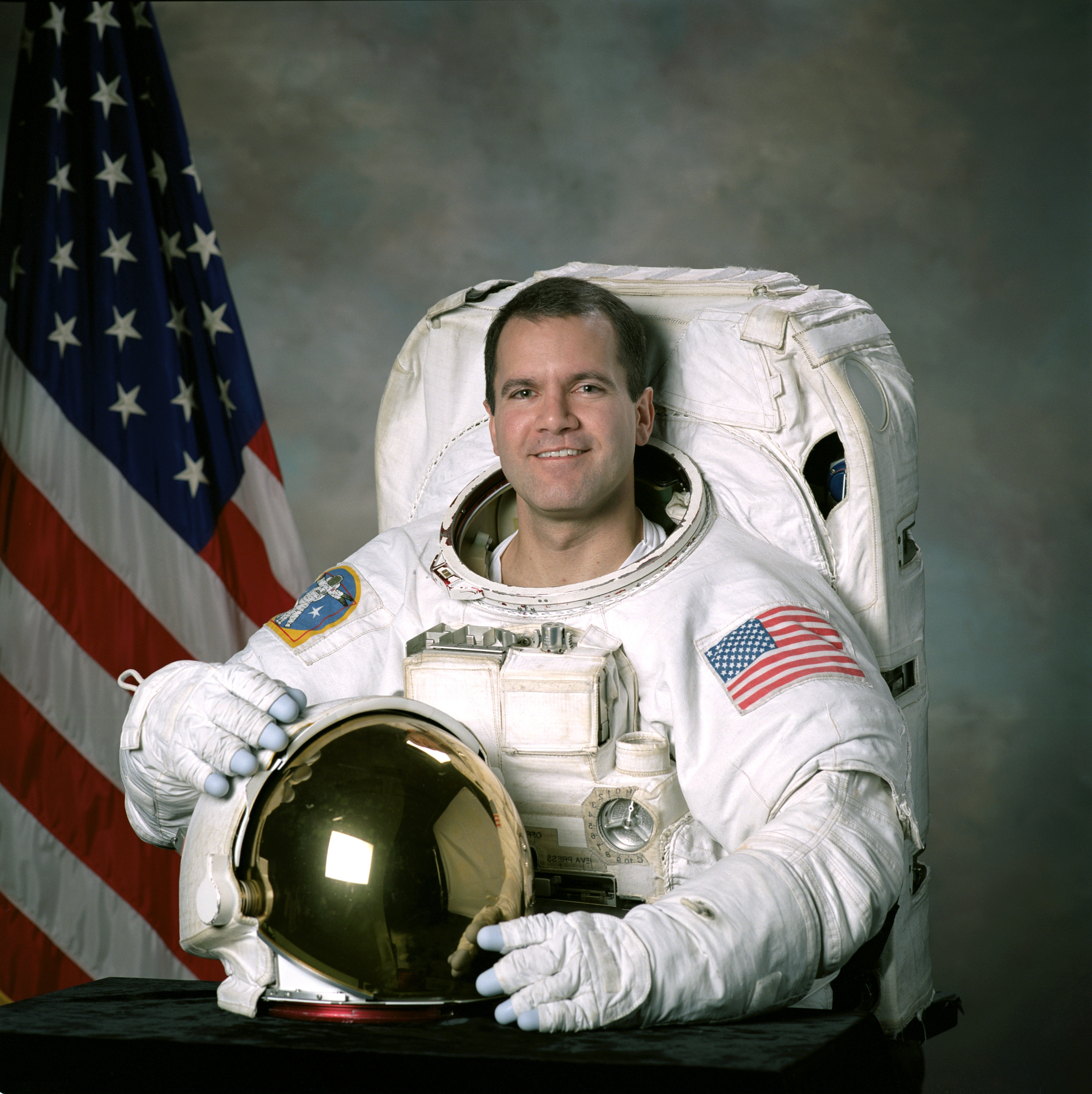
- Born: Paul William Richards; May 20, 1964 (age 62); Scranton, Pennsylvania, U.S.
- Education: Drexel University (BS); University of Maryland, College Park (MS)
- Space career

NASA astronaut
- Time in space: 12d 19h 49m
- Selection: NASA Group 16 (1996)
- Total EVAs: 1
- Total EVA time: 6h, 21m
- Missions: STS-102

Paul William Richards (born May 20, 1964 in Scranton, Pennsylvania) is an American engineer and a former NASA astronaut. He flew aboard one Space Shuttle mission in 2001.

== Education ==
Richards graduated from Dunmore High School, Dunmore, Pennsylvania, in 1982. He received a Bachelor of Science degree in mechanical engineering from Drexel University, where he was a member of Sigma Pi fraternity in 1987. He was awarded a Master of Science degree in mechanical engineering from the University of Maryland, College Park in 1991.

Richards is a member of the American Society of Mechanical Engineers (ASME), National Society of Professional Engineers (NSPE), American Institute for Aeronautics and Astronautics (AIAA), and the American Society of Naval Engineers, United States Naval Reserves.

== Early career ==
Department of the Navy, Naval Ship Systems Engineering Station, 1983–1987. Transferred to NASA Goddard Space Flight Center (GSFC) in 1987. Worked in the Verification Office, Electromechanical Branch, Robotics Branch, Guidance and Controls Branch, all within the Engineering Directorate. Senior EVA Tool Development Engineer for the Hubble Space Telescope (HST) Servicing Project. Project Manager for HST EVA crew aids and tools. Program Manager for HST EVA Hardware. Responsibilities included the budget, schedule, design, analysis, fabrication, test, and integration for breadboard, WETF/NBS, engineering, and flight hardware, documentation, and review process. Additional duties included systems engineering support for the HST WETF/NBS Servicing Mission Simulations as a utility diver and EMU suited subject. Richards is the inventor of the Pistol Grip Tool (PGT). The PGT is a self-contained, computer- controlled, battery-powered 3/8 inch drive power tool with a pistol-style handle. Numerous torque, speed and turn limits can be programmed into the tool for mission-specific applications. A light emitting diode display on the tool tells the astronaut what torque he or she is applying, at what speed, and how many turns the motor has made. It also displays error messages. The motorized torque ranges from 2 to 25 foot-pounds, the speed from 5 to 60 rotations per minute, and the number of turns from 0 to 999. In manual mode, the Pistol Grip Tool can apply 38 foot-pounds of torque. The specifications for every fastener are preprogrammed into the PGT before each mission and the PGT then logs the actual data during EVA. The PGT has been used on every NASA spacewalk (EVA), since 1996.

== NASA career ==
Selected by NASA in April 1996, Richards reported to the Johnson Space Center in August 1996. Having completed two years of training and evaluation, he was qualified for flight assignment as a mission specialist. Richards was initially assigned to the Computer Branch working on software for the Space Shuttle and the International Space Station. He next served in the Astronaut Office Shuttle Operations Branch assigned to support Payload and General Support Computers (PGSCs) and the Shuttle Avionics Integration Laboratory (SAIL). Richards flew on STS-102 and has logged over 307 hours in space, including 6.4 EVA hours. He was assigned as a back-up crew member for ISS Expedition-7. Richards retired from NASA in February 2002 to pursue private interests.

In 2004 Richards returned to NASA GSFC as the Observatory Manager for the Geostationary Operational Environmental Satellite (GOES-R Series). The GOES-R series is the next-generation of advanced weather satellites being developed by the National Oceanic and Atmospheric Administration (NOAA) in partnership with NASA. In 2014, he was promoted to Deputy Project Manager for the Laser Communications Relay Demonstration (LCRD) Project. LCRD will demonstrate the next-generation of satellite communication using laser technology. In 2018 Richards was detailed to NASA HQ as a Program Executive for NASA’s Satellite Communications and Navigation (SCaN) Program. He retired from NASA in 2019.

=== Spaceflights ===
STS-102 Discovery (March 8–21, 2001) was the eighth Shuttle mission to visit the International Space Station. Mission accomplishments included the delivery of the Expedition-2 crew and the contents of the Leonardo Multi-Purpose Logistics Module, the return to Earth of the Expedition-1 crew, as well as the return of Leonardo, the reusable cargo carrier built by the Italian Space Agency. Richards performed an EVA totaling 6 hours and 21 minutes. Mission duration was 307 hours and 49 minutes.

== Awards and honors ==
- NASA Space Flight Medal
- Department of Defense Superior Service Medal
- NASA Exceptional Service Medal
- Silver Snoopy award (1994)
- NASA Exceptional Achievement Medal (1994)
- US Patent for Computerized Pistol Grip Power Tool
- US Patent for Pistol Grip Power Tool Software
- HST First Servicing Mission Development Team
- HST First Servicing Mission Extravehicular Activity Team
- HST First Servicing Mission Crew Aids and Tools Development Team
- HST First Servicing Mission Integration and Test Team
- HST First Servicing Mission Space Support Equipment Team
- NASA Manned Flight Awareness Award (1994)
- NASA Outstanding Performance Awards (1992, 1994, 1995)
- Certificate of Outstanding Performance (1990, 1993, 1994)
- Group Achievement Award UARS and GRO MMS and UASE Support Team (1992)
