= External stowage platform =

Components of the International Space Station

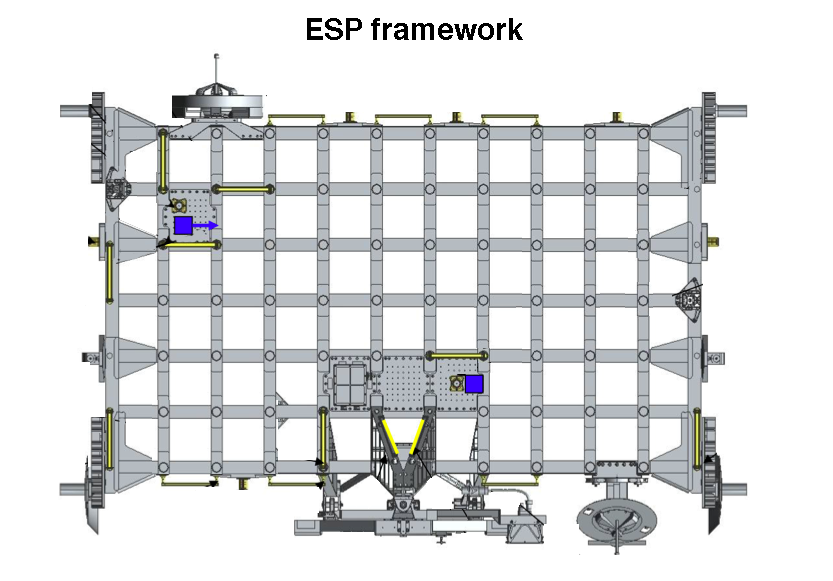
ESP-3 framework

External stowage platforms (ESPs) are key components of the International Space Station (ISS). Each platform is made from steel and serves as an external pallet that can hold spare parts, also known as orbital replacement units (ORUs), for the space station. As a platform it is not pressurized, but does require electricity to power the heaters of some of the stored equipment. ORUs are attached to the ESP via Flight Releasable Attachment Mechanisms (FRAMs), matching witness plates that mate the ORU to the platform.

While ESP-1 is unique in shape, ESP-2 and ESP-3 were based on the deployable version of the Integrated Cargo Carriers (ICC), which were designed to transport unpressurized cargo inside the Space Shuttle's cargo bay. ESP-1 was transported to the International Space Station on STS-102, ESP-2 flew on mission STS-114 'Return to Flight' and ESP-3 on mission STS-118.

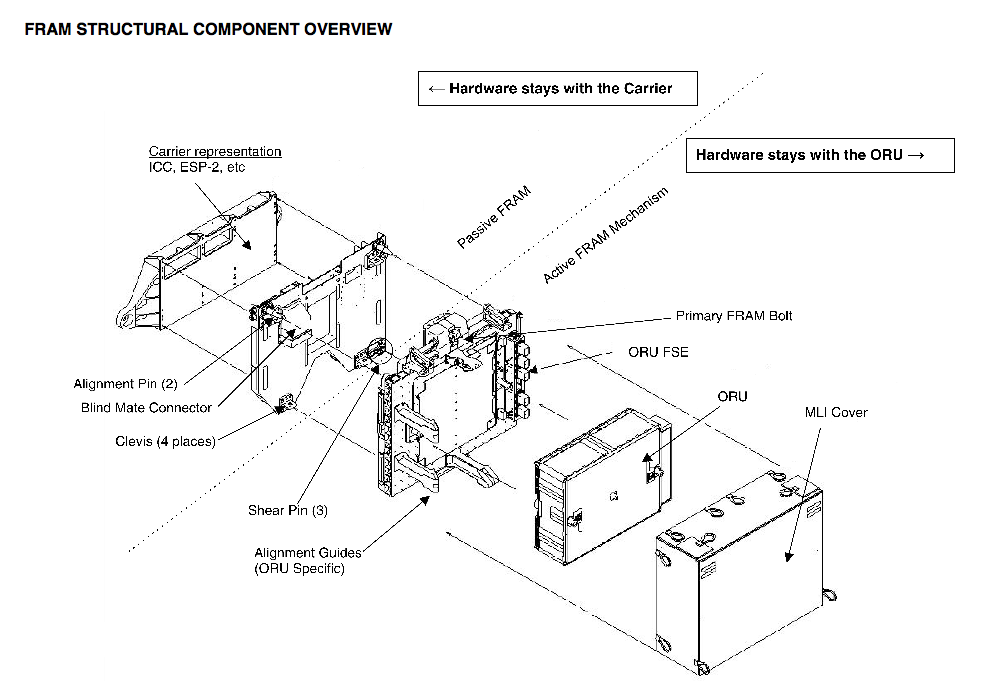
FRAM breakdown

== Locations and components ==
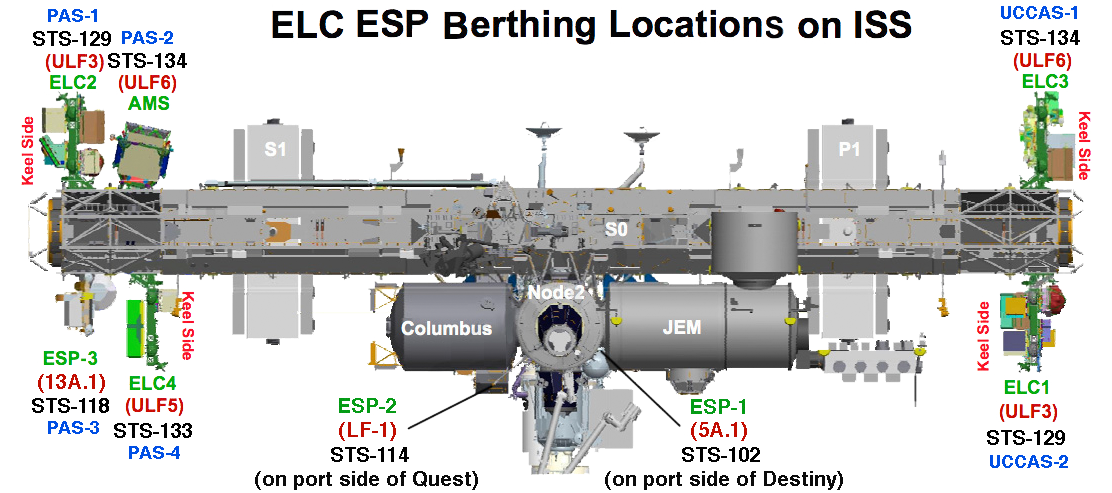
Location of ESPs on the International Space Station

== ESP-1 ==
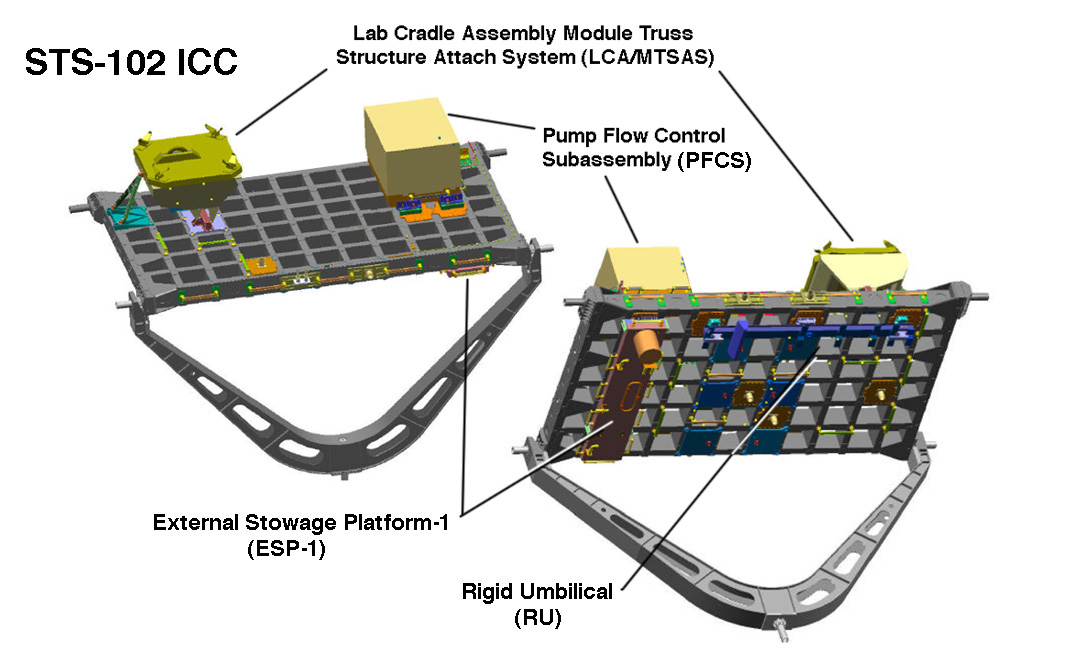
STS-102 ICC carrying ESP-1 on its underside

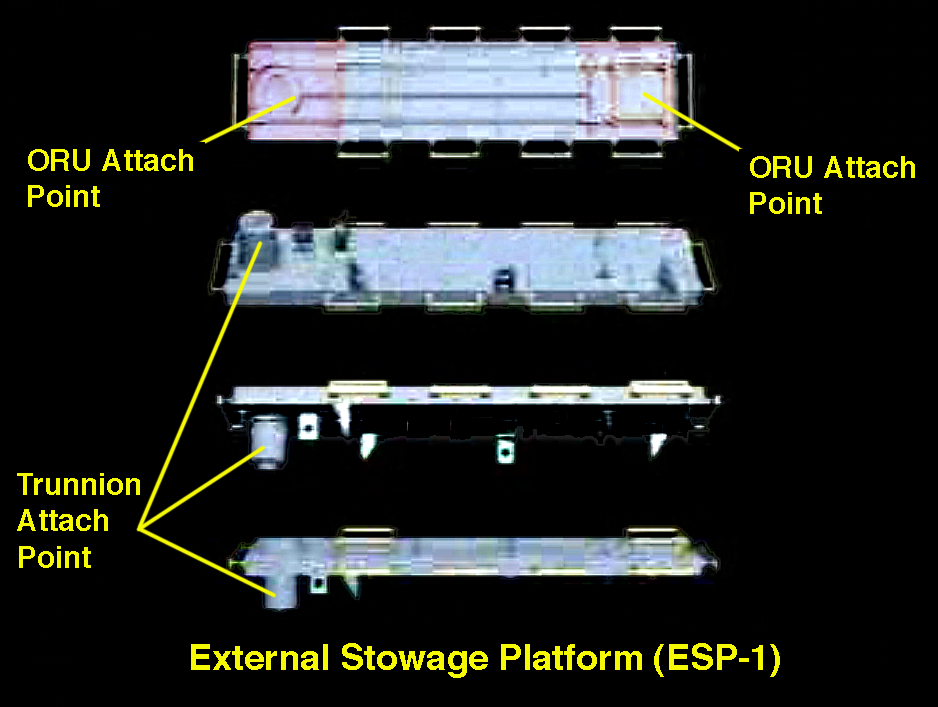
Multi-plane view of ESP-1

The first of the external stowage platforms, called ESP-1, was installed on the port side trunnion pin on the outer hull of the Destiny Laboratory Module on March 13, 2001 during the second EVA of the STS-102 Space Shuttle mission. It is powered by the Unity Module and has two attach points to store ORUs.

ESP-1 was carried into orbit on the underside of an Integrated Cargo Carrier. It is smaller than the other ESPs and ELCs, with dimensions approximately 0.46 m wide by 2.4 m long, and is differently shaped.

ESP-1 holds the following ORUs:

- FRAM-1 Pump Flow Control System (PFCS) nicknamed 'Leaky' from ITS-P6 was swapped out during an EVA on Exp. 55 May 18, 2018 with the PFCS nicknamed 'Frosty' originally added here by the STS-102 crew
- FRAM-2 Direct-Current Switching Unit (DCSU) added by STS-100 crew
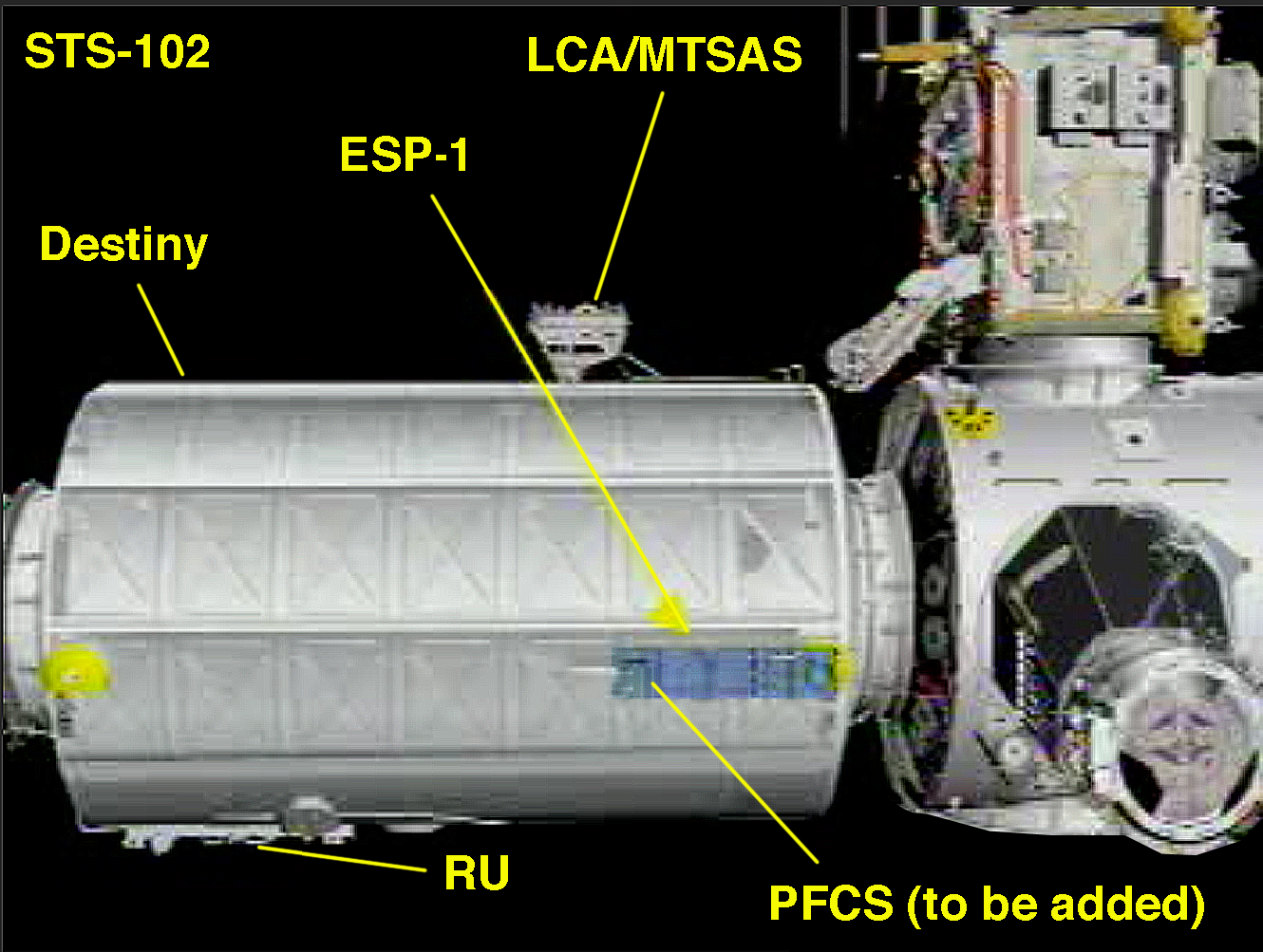
ESP-1 and hardware installation locations on the Destiny during STS-102

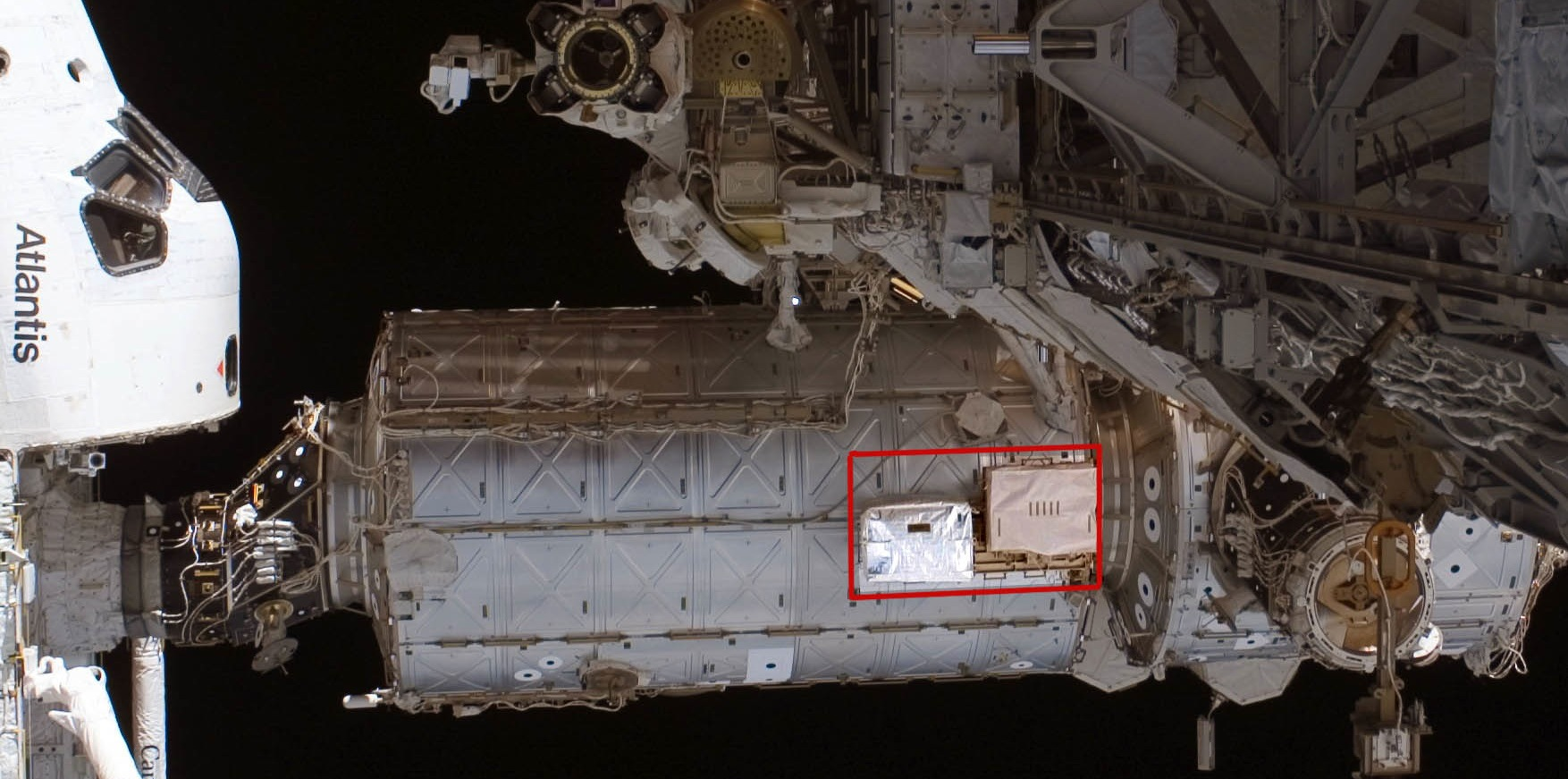
ESP-1 attached to the Destiny portside trunnion pin, PFCS on the left

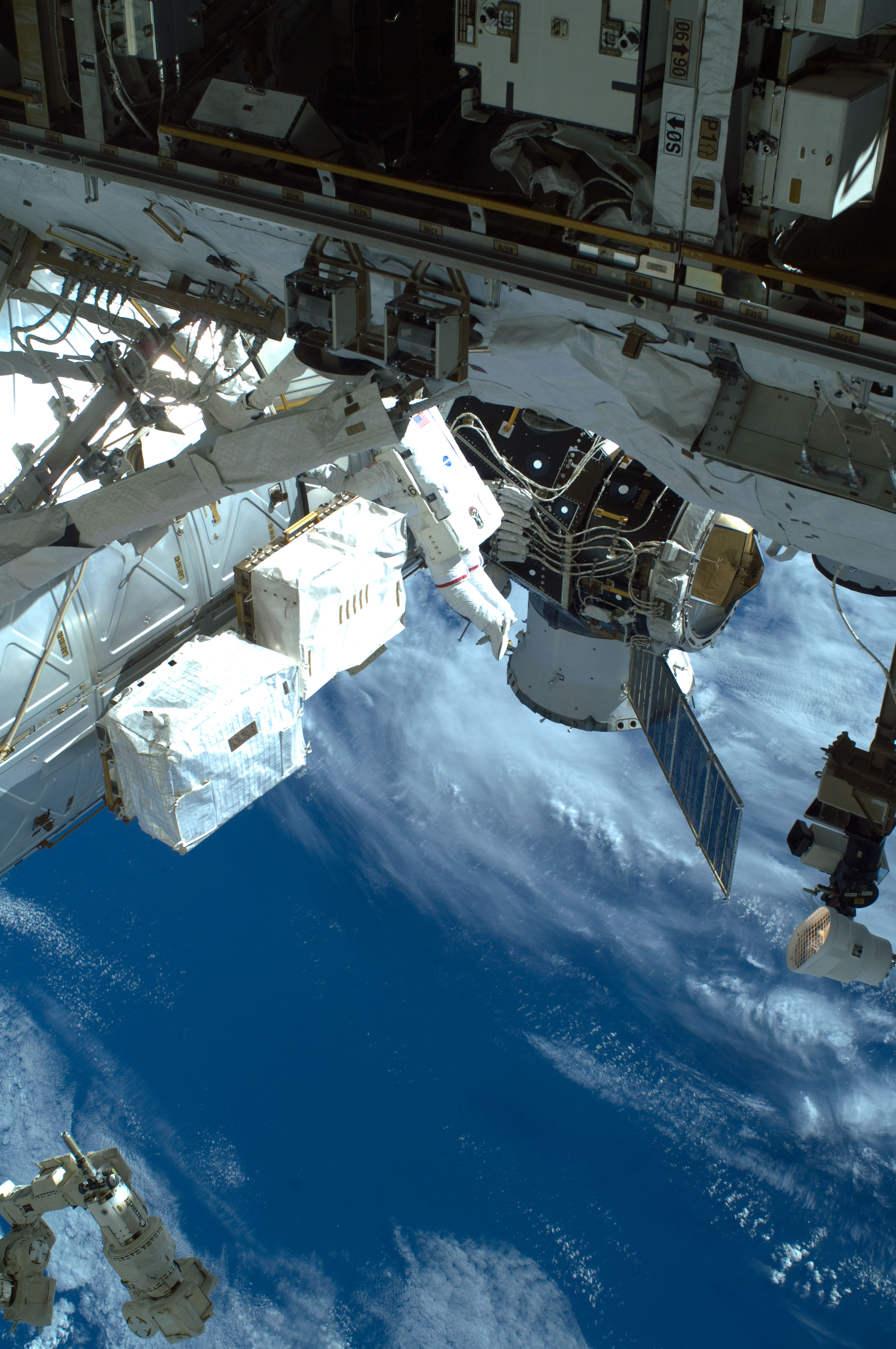
Another view of ESP-1

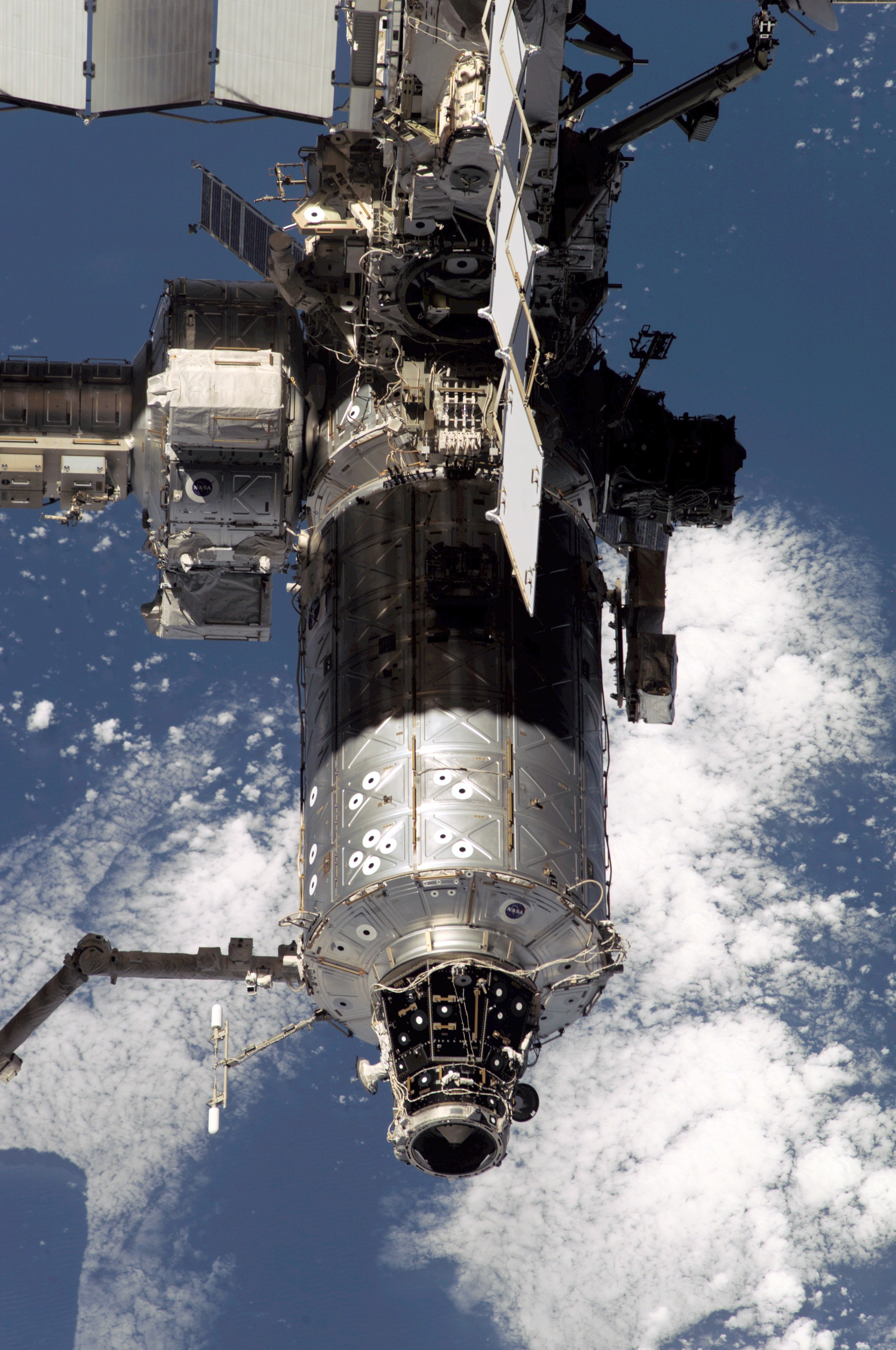
ESP-1 attached to the Destiny portside trunnion pin on the right

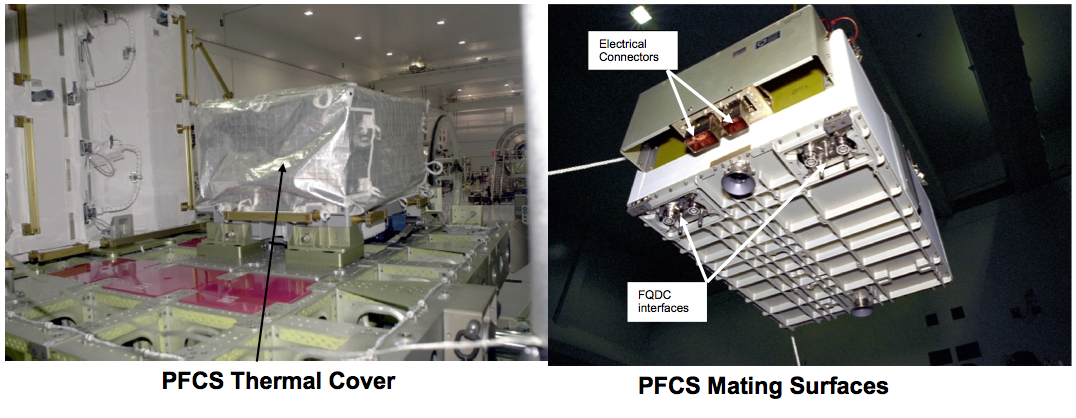
PFCS attach points

== ESP-2 ==
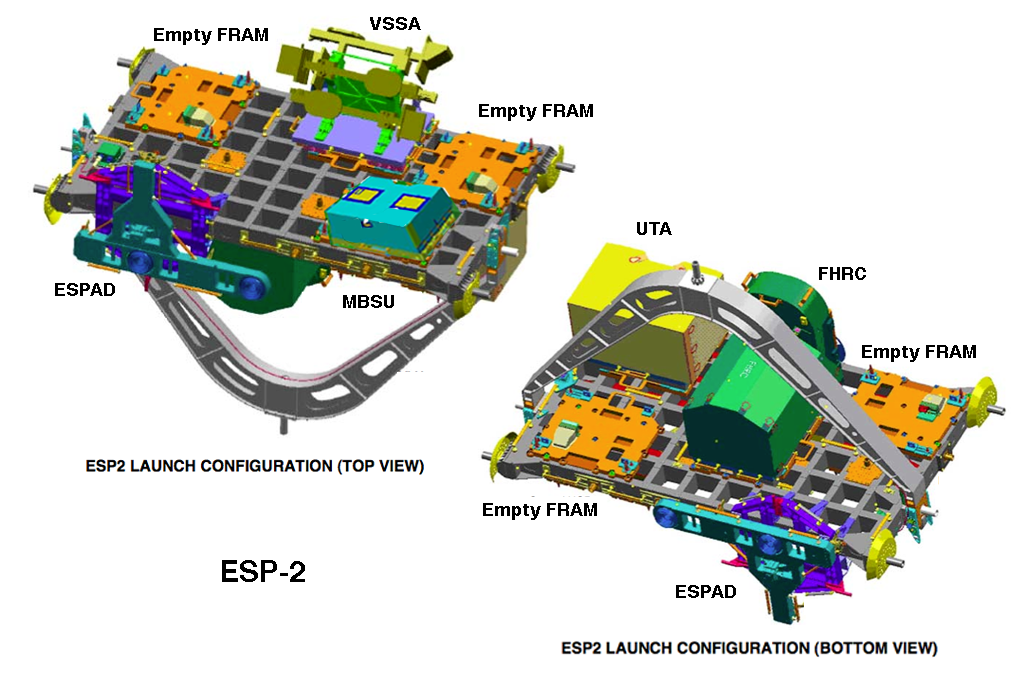
ESP-2 in launch configuration with yoke

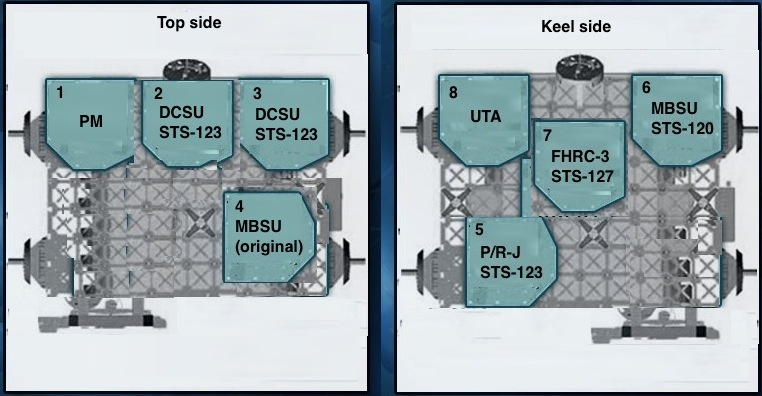
ESP-2 updated FRAM ORUs

ESP-2 was detached from its Keel Yoke Assembly (which remained in the Orbiter) and installed with the assistance of Space Shuttle Discovery's robotic arm and two spacewalkers during the STS-114 mission. It is much larger than ESP-1 with eight FRAM sites creating room for up to eight spare parts (ORUs). Like ESP-1, it is powered by the Unity Module. However, unlike ESP-1, ESP-2 is attached to the Quest Joint Airlock using a specialized ESP Attachment Device (ESPAD). ESP-2 and ESP-3 are deployable versions of the integrated cargo carrier and have the same dimensions, approximately 8.5 feet (2.6 m) long and 14 feet (4.3 m) wide. The ORUs on ESP-2 are:

- FRAM-1 (top side) Pump Module SN0005. Moved here robotically from ELC-2 on 6 March 2015 in a swap with failed Pump Module SN0004, which had been relocated here by the ISS-41 US EVA-27 crew in Oct. 2014
- FRAM-2 (top side) SSRMS Pitch/Roll Joint #6 ((SSRMS P/R‐J #6) FRAM originally held Direct Current Switching Unit #8 (DCSU #8) (added by STS-123 crew) FRAM formerly held the VSSA
- FRAM-3 (top side) CTC-3 container moved here via SPDM. DCSU added by STS-123 crew) had been relocated via SPDM Jan. 30, 2013 to ELC-2.
- FRAM-4 (top side) Main Buss Switching Unit #1 (MBSU #1)
- FRAM-5 (keel side) Pitch/Roll Joint (P/R-J) added by STS-123 crew FRAM formerly held a CMG
- FRAM-6 (keel side) Main Bus Switching Unit (MBSU) added by STS-120 crew This unit was swapped with a failed unit MBSU #1 from the SO truss, by the Exp 32 crew in late 2012 Failed Unit returned to earth on CRS 12.
- FRAM-7 (keel side) Flex Hose Rotary Coupler (FHRC SN1003) launched on ESP-2
- FRAM-8 (keel side) .S band Antenna Sub-System Assembly #1 (SASA) Support Equipment FRAM formerly held Latching End Effector Support Equipment #5 (LEE #5) moved here via SPDM from ELC1.Flight support equipment moved to ELC 3 FRAM formerly held Utility Transfer Assembly (UTA) which was launched on ESP-2 UTA relocated to ELC 3 FRAM 8 to stage for SASA #1's return to Earth.

Notes:

- Video Stanchion Support Assembly (VSSA) launched on ESP-2 at FRAM-2 was jettisoned overboard on July 23, 2007 (the video stanchions were placed on the truss during EVAs).
- Pump Module (PM) (SN0004), initially installed on FRAM-1 during STS-121, was removed on August 17, 2010 by the Exp 24 crew and installed on S1 Truss, replacing the original (failed) PM SN0002. The failed unit had been temporarily stored on an ORU site on the MBS, then moved to ESP-2 by the STS-133 crew, then returned to earth by the STS-135 crew July 13, 2011.
- A failed Control Moment Gyroscope was installed on FRAM-5 from August 13, 2007 during STS-118 until February 13, 2008 when it was returned by STS-122.
- MBSU was moved to the truss during Expedition 52 and the Latching End Effector was moved to ESP2 to prepare for the spacewalk on January 23, 2018. The failed MBSU was returned to earth on Space X CRS12.
- LEE #1 support equipment was stowed here until 2018 when Lee #5 was installed LEE #1 support equipment disposed on CRS 15.
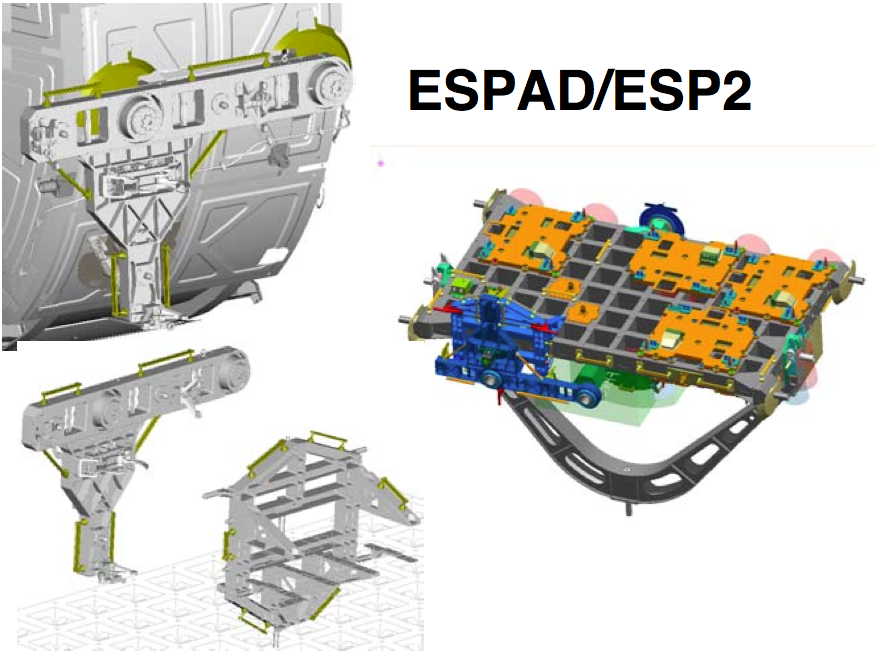
ESPAD mount used to secure ESP-2 to Quest

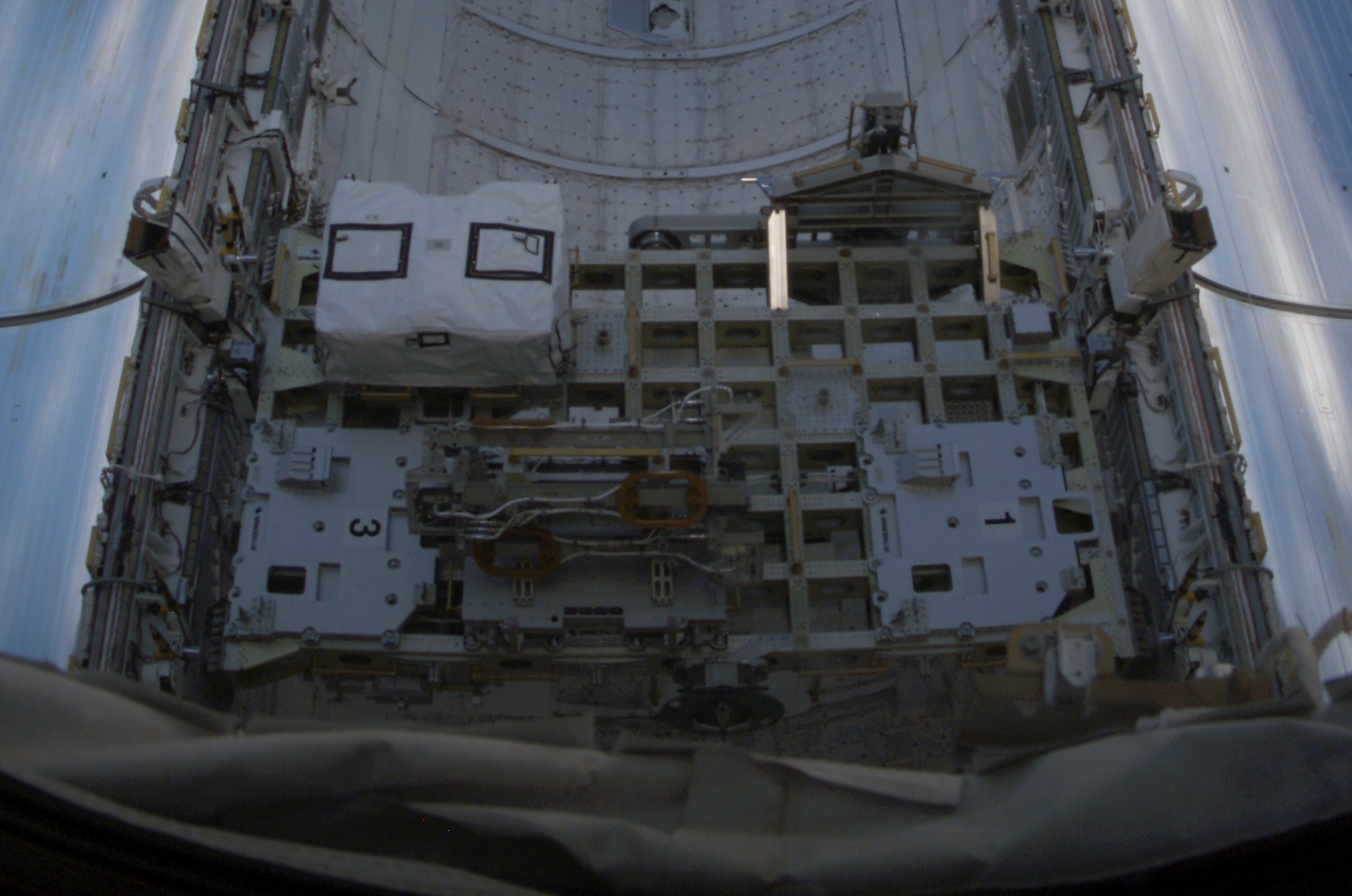
ESP-2 in the payload bay of STS-114

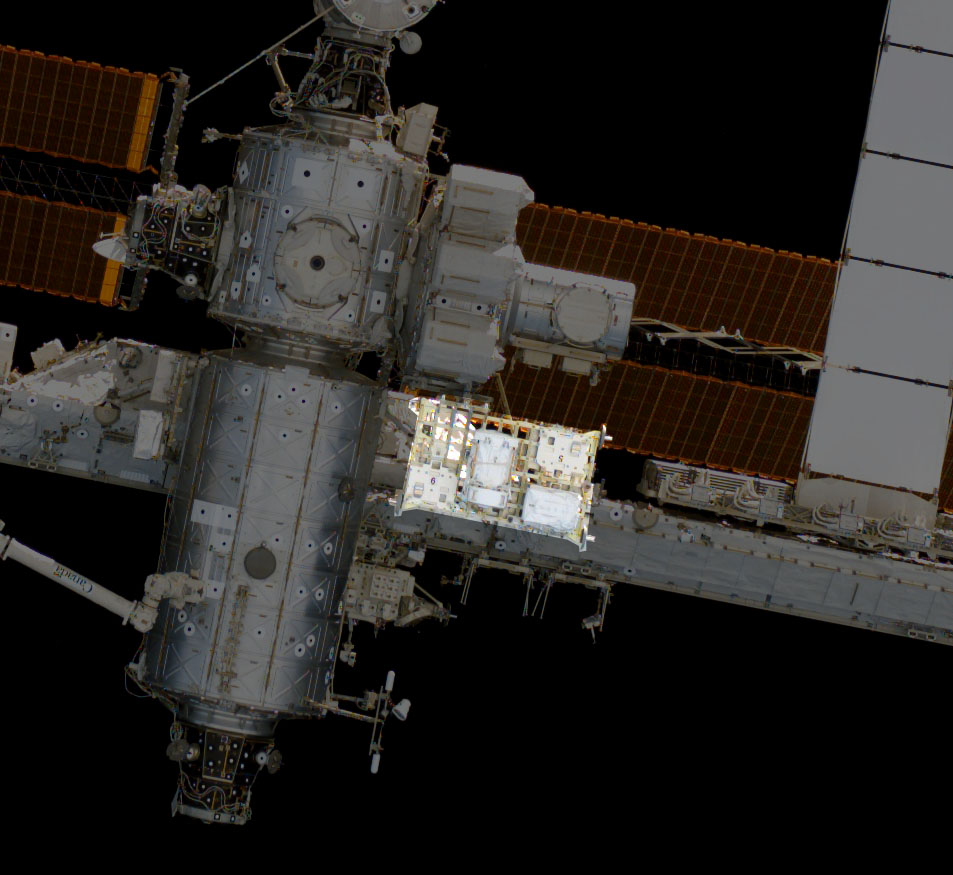
ESP-2 can be seen highlighted and under the Quest Joint Airlock

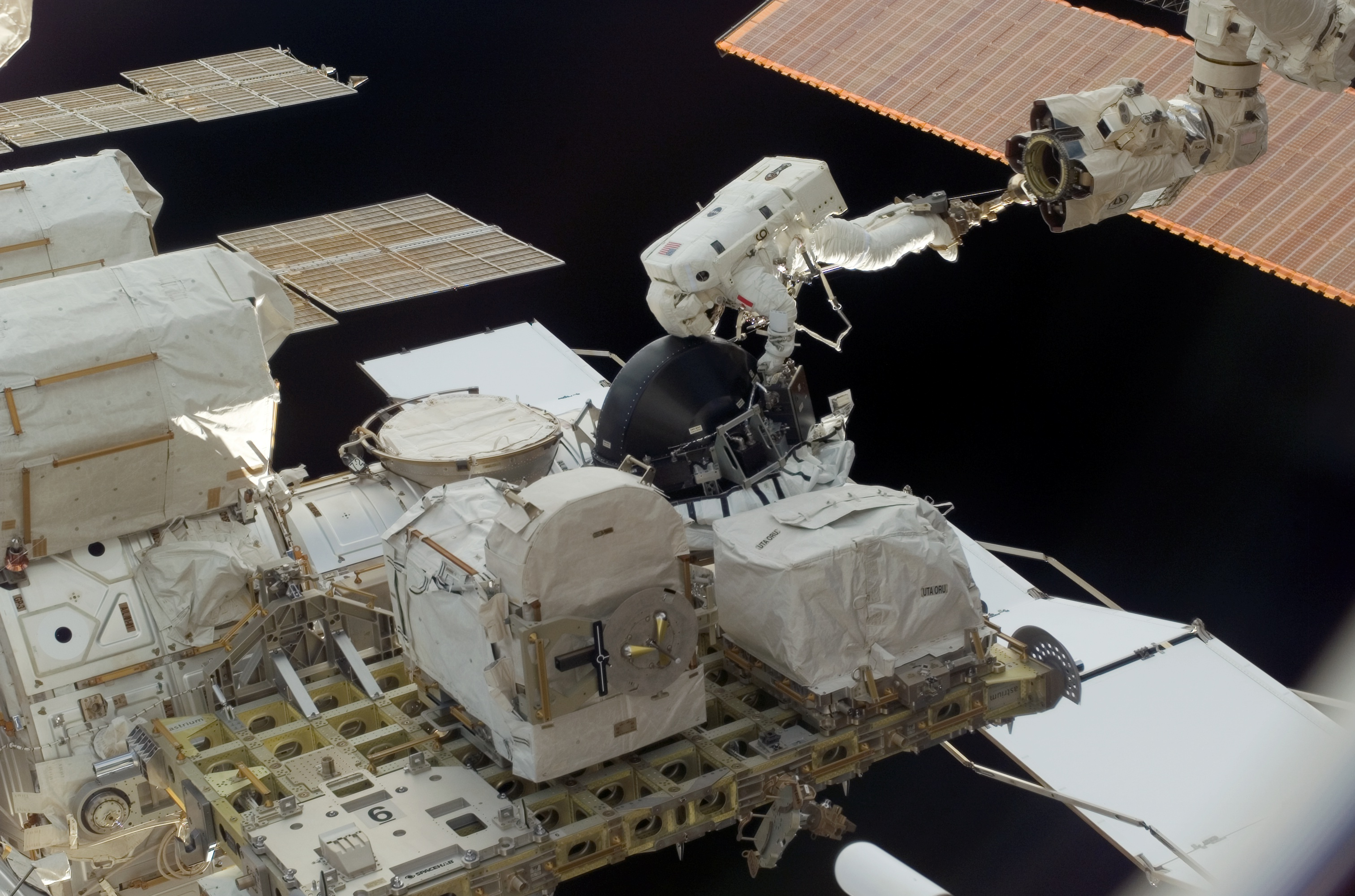
ESP-2 viewed during STS-118 EVA to remove a failed CMG for return to earth

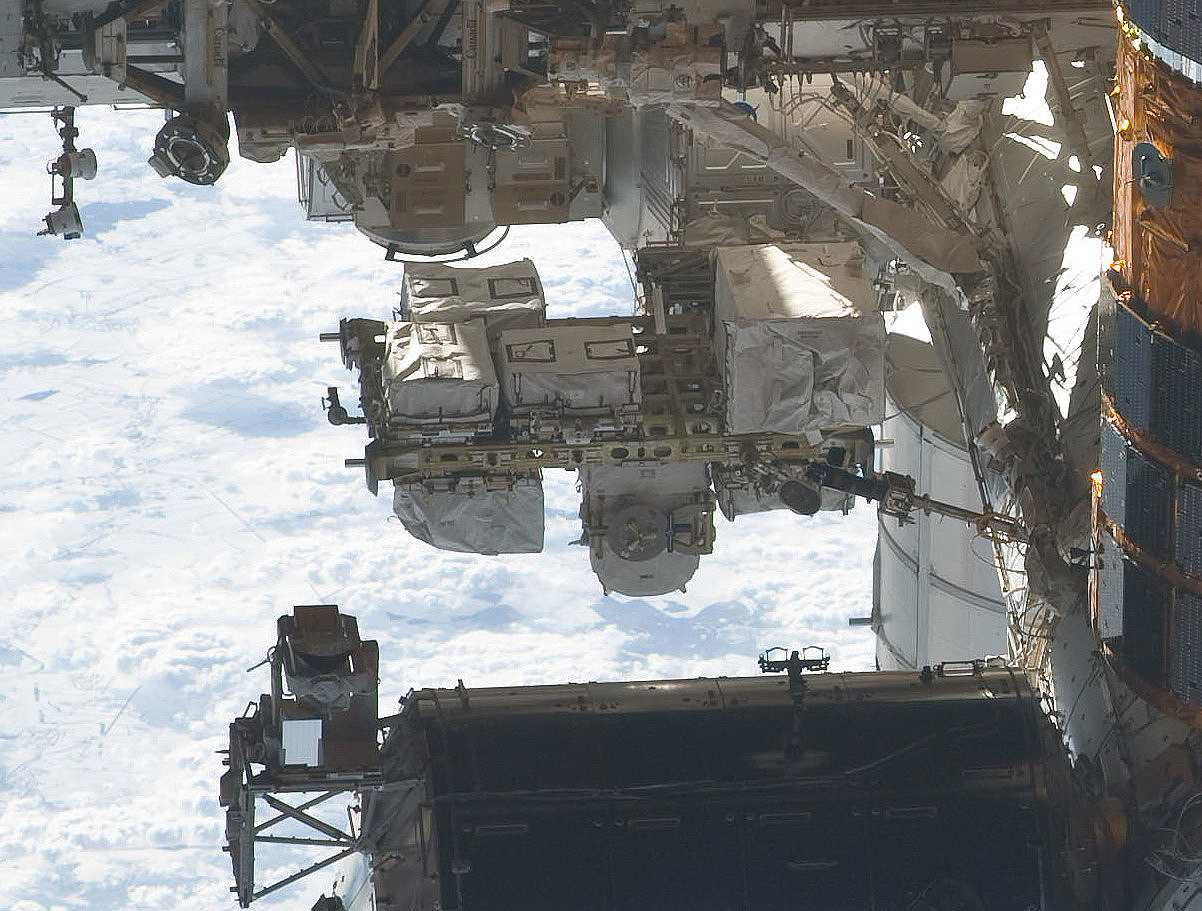
ESP-2 viewed by the departing STS-133 crew

== ESP-3 ==
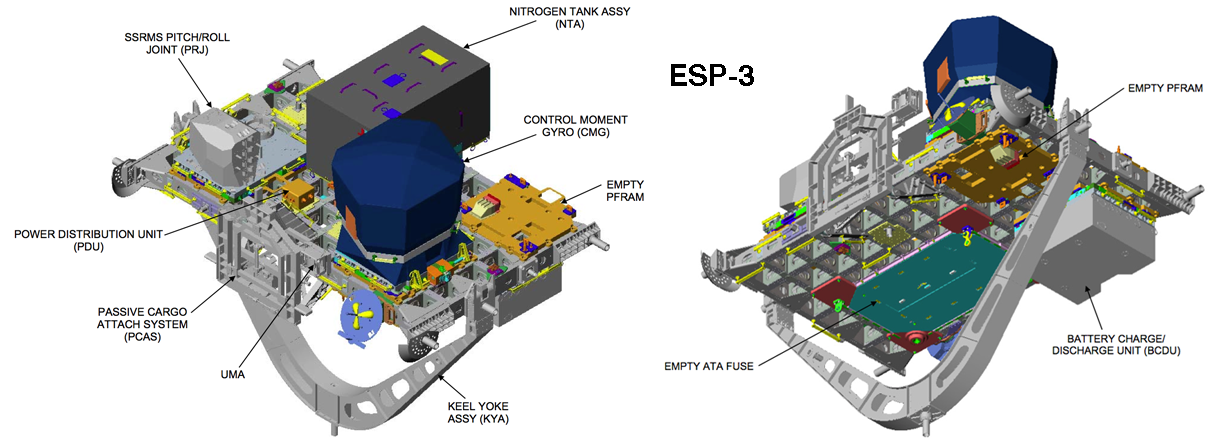
ESP-3 launch configuration (with yoke)

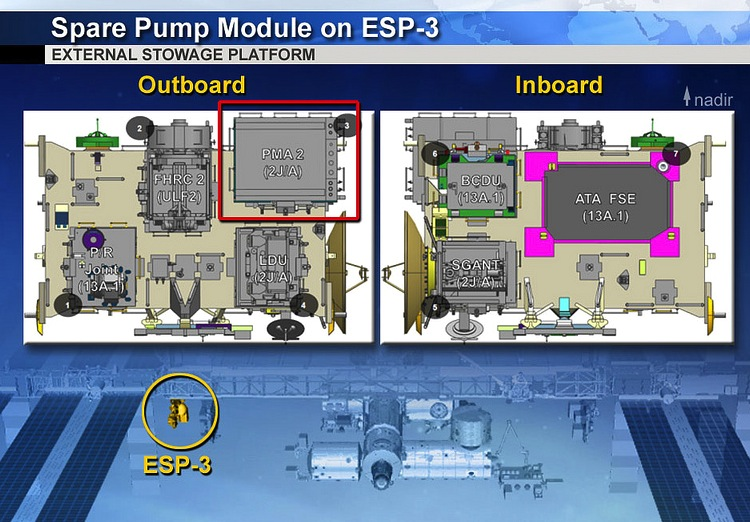
ESP-3 ORU locations ISS Exp 38

ESP-3 was detached from its Keel Yoke Assembly (which remained in the Orbiter) and installed on the P3 Truss at UCCAS-1 on August 14, 2007 during the Space Shuttle STS-118 mission. It has seven attachment sites for ISS spare parts and assemblies, called Orbital Replacement Units (ORUs). The platform also has handrails and attachment points for tethers and foot restraints that astronauts can use while working with the ORUs on the ESP-3. ESP-3, as with ESP-2 are deployable versions of the Integrated Cargo Carrier and have the same dimensions, approximately 8.5 feet long and 14 feet wide. ESP-3 has two grapple fixtures to aid deployment.

ESP-3 was the first major station element to be installed completely by robotics, using only the shuttle and station's robotic arms, an external berthing camera system (BCS) and a Photovoltaic Radiator Grapple Fixture (PVRGF). Astronauts robotically installed the platform onto the station's P3 truss segment during the STS-118 mission's seventh day.

On January 12, 2010, the station's robotic arm was used again to move ESP-3 from the P3 truss segment UCCAS-1 site. It was grappled by the arm and then transferred down the station's backbone on the mobile transporter. ESP-3 was then attached to its new location on the lower part of S3 truss segment at the PAS-3 site. Moving the storage platform cleared the way for ExPRESS Logistics Carrier-3 to be installed during STS-134.

The ORUs (currently) installed on ESP-3 are:

- FRAM-1 (top side) Pitch/roll joint (P/R‐J#8) swapped for Pitch/roll joint (P/R‐J#6) launched on ESP-3 moved to ESP 2 (see above)
- FRAM-2 (top side) Flex Hose Rotary Coupler (FHRC SN1004) added by STS-126 crew
- FRAM-3 (top side) Pump Module #7 (PM #7)
- FRAM-4 (top side) Control Movement Gyroscope #2 (CMG #2) Linear Drive Unit (LDU) added by STS-127 crew relocated to ELC 2
- FRAM-5 (keel side) Space-to-Ground Antenna #2 (SGANT #2) added by STS-127 crew
- FRAM-6 (keel side) Battery Charge/Discharge Unit #19 support equipment (BCDU #19) launched on ESP-3
- FRAM-7 (keel side) ATA Flight Support Equipment (FSE) added by STS-118 crew.

Notes:

FRAM-2 originally hosted NTA tank (SN0005) that was launched on ESP-3, it was swapped for the depleted NTA (SN0002) from the S1 truss during STS-124. That failed unit was later returned on STS-126 when the FHRC was placed here.

FRAM-3 hosted Pump Module (PM) SN0006 that was added by the STS-127 crew. The ISS Exp 38 crew swapped PM SN0006 with the failed PM SN0004 from the S1 Truss during 2 EVAs Dec. 21 and 24, 2013, leaving PM SN0004 on the MBS ORU POA for later storage. It was eventually (in Oct. 2014) stored on ESP-2 FRAM-1, rather than ESP-3 FRAM-3.

FRAM-4 hosted a CMG & frame and both were removed Aug. 13, 2007 during STS-118. Support frame was placed on ESP-2, CMG was installed in the Z1. The failed CMG was placed on the CMG frame on ESP-2 FRAM-5 and later returned to earth by STS-124.

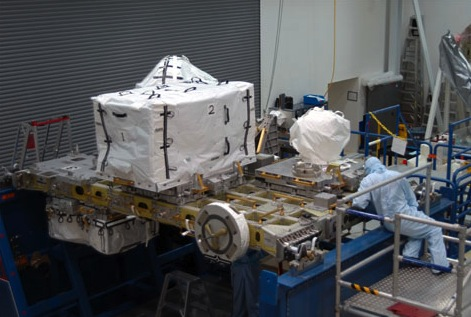
Nitrogen tank assembly (NTA) preflight

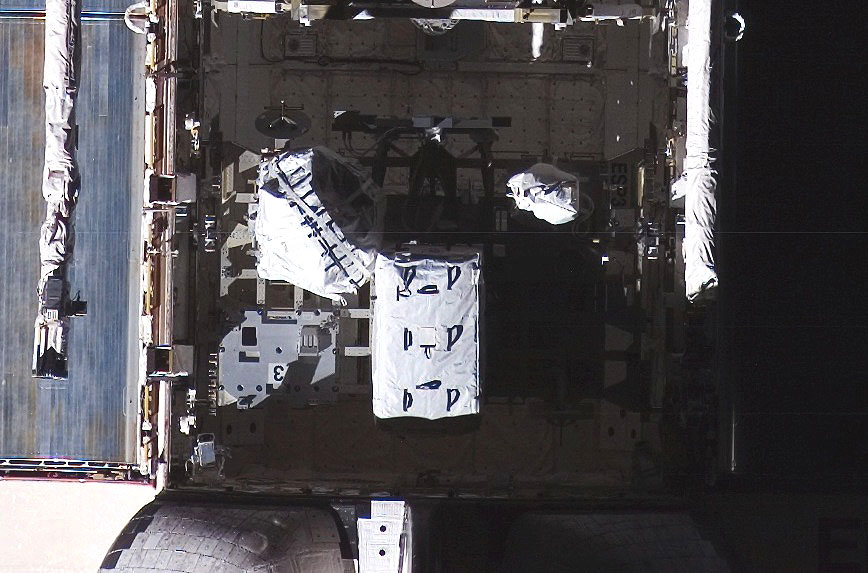
ESP-3 in the payload bay of STS-118

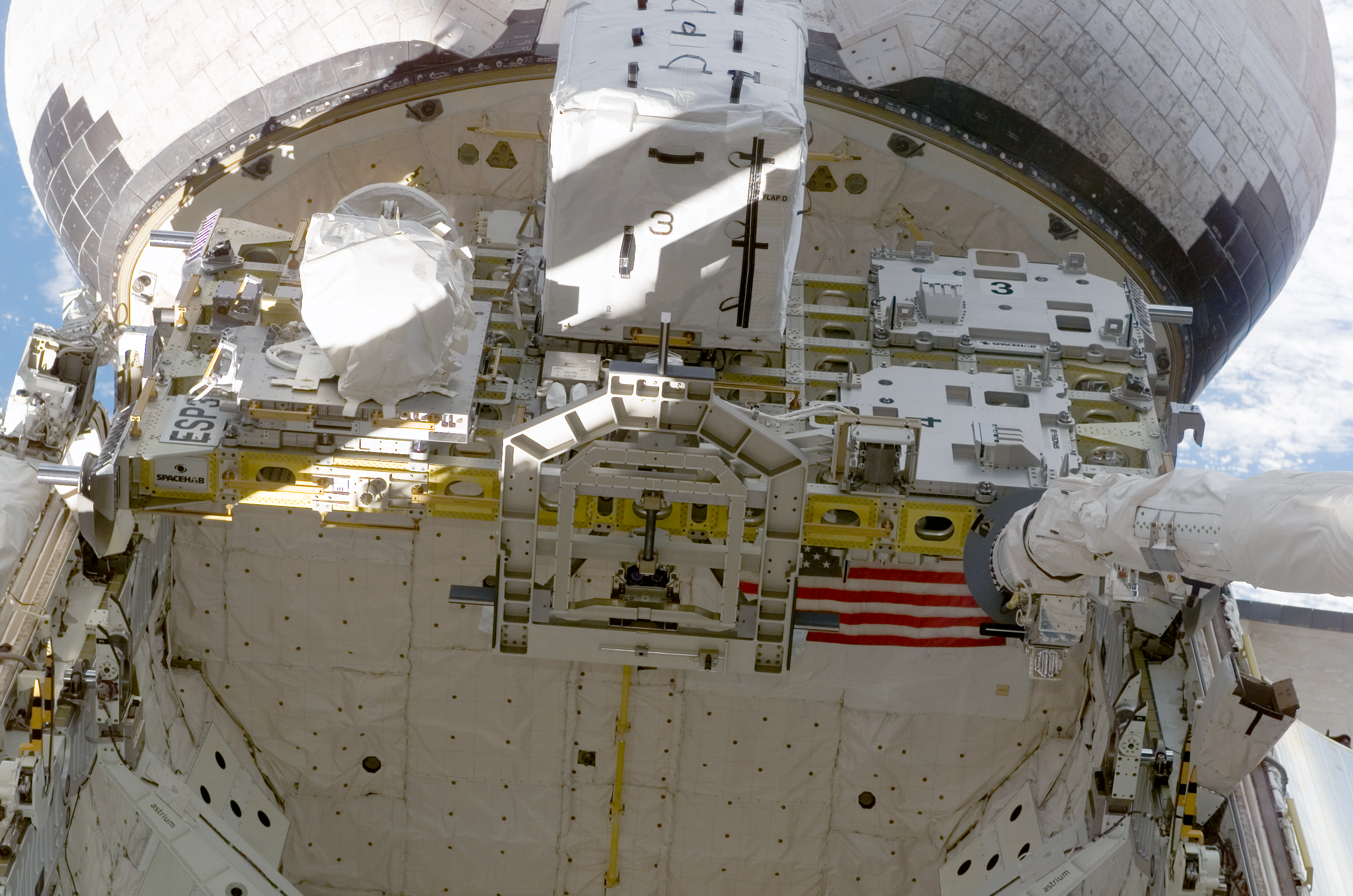
ESP-3 in the payload bay

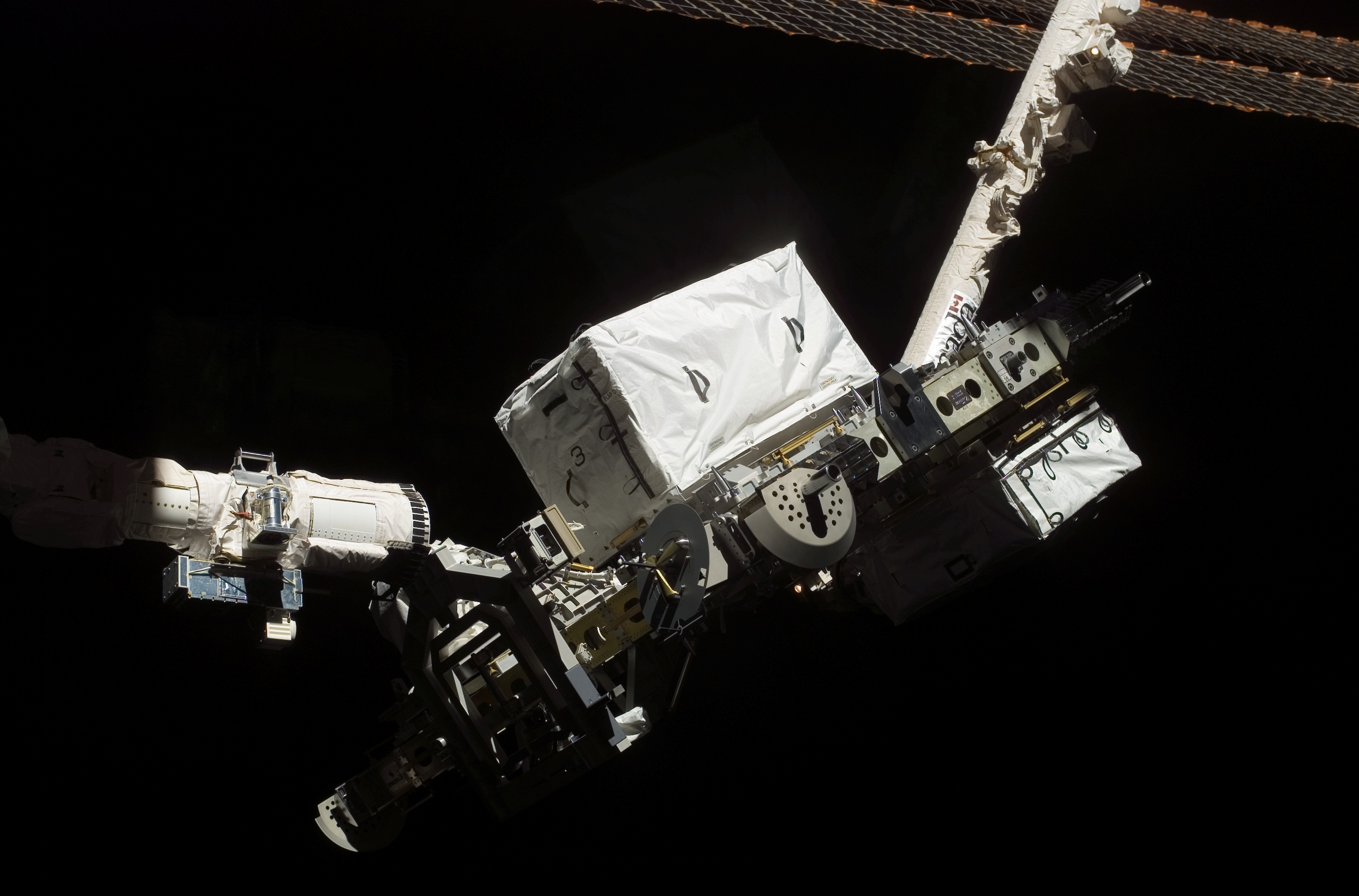
ESP-3 being installed by Canadarm2.

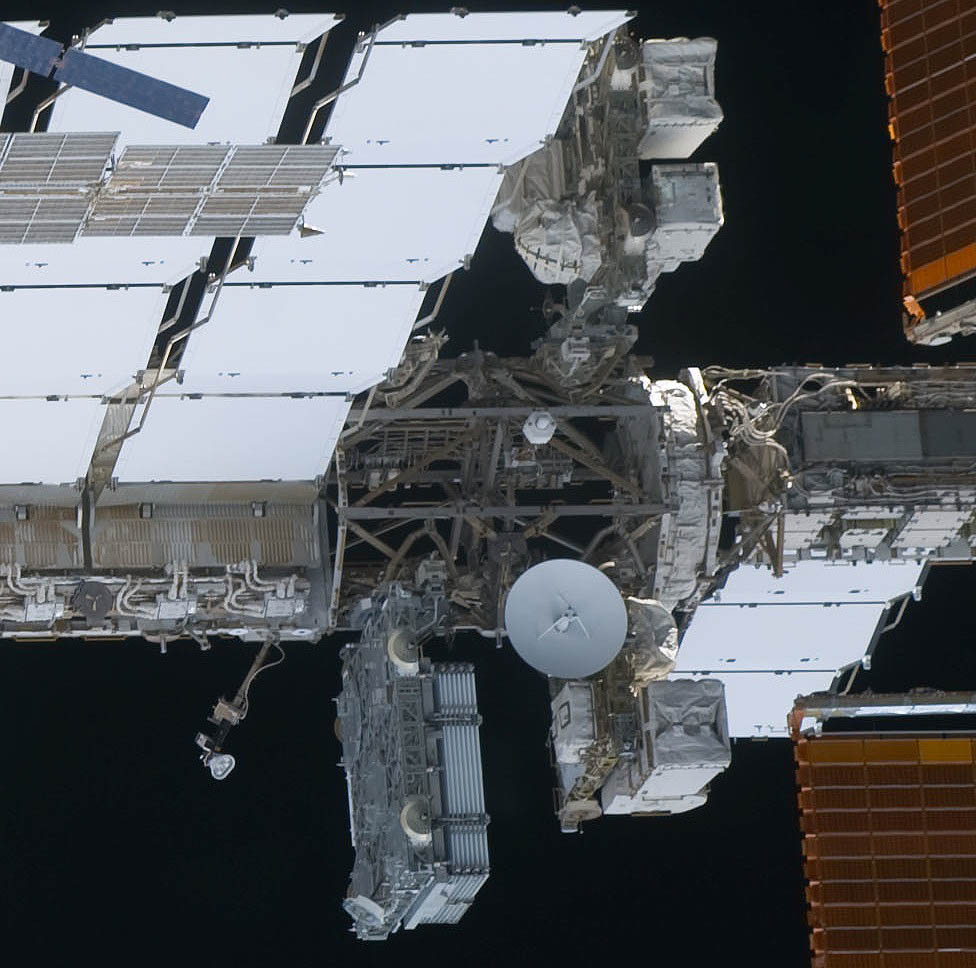
ESP-3 view from the departing STS-133 crew. ESP-3 has the SGANT antenna, note ELC-4 on the left and ELC-2 above

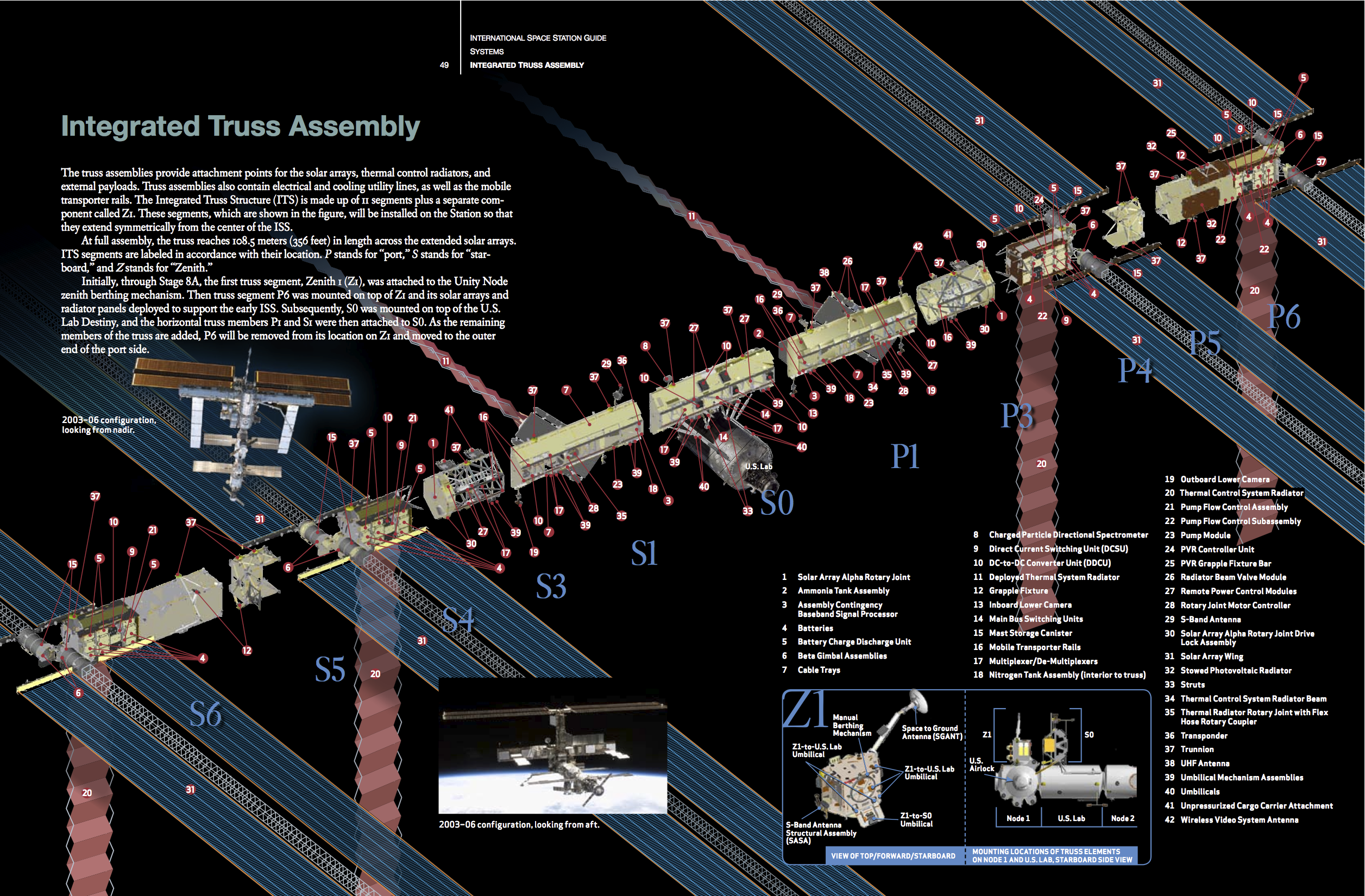
ISS truss components and ORUs in situ

== See also ==
- Scientific research on the ISS
