= STS-102 =

2001 American crewed spaceflight to the ISS

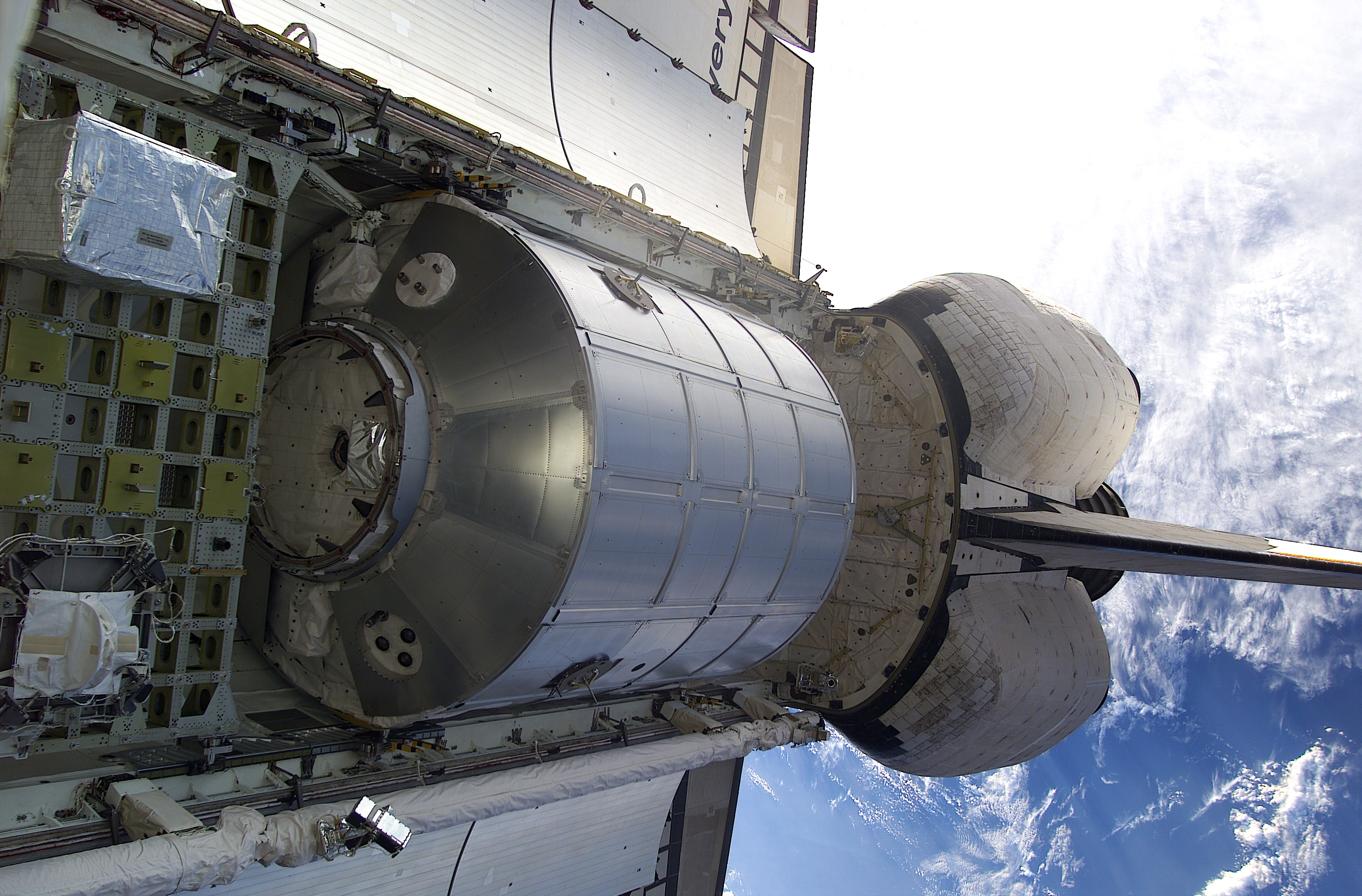
- ICC (left) and the MPLM Leonardo (center) in Discovery's payload bay
- Names: Space Transportation System-102
- Mission type: ISS crew transport and resupply
- Operator: NASA
- COSPAR ID: 2001-010A
- SATCAT no.: 26718
- Mission duration: 12 days, 19 hours, 49 minutes, 32 seconds
- Distance travelled: 8,621,951 km (5,357,432 mi)
- Orbits completed: 102

Spacecraft properties
- Spacecraft: Space Shuttle Discovery
- Launch mass: 99,503 kg (219,367 lb)
- Landing mass: 90,043 kg (198,511 lb)
- Payload mass: 5,760 kg (12,700 lb)

Crew
- Crew size: 7
- Members: James D. Wetherbee; James M. Kelly; Andrew S. W. Thomas; Paul W. Richards
- Launching: Yuri V. Usachov; James S. Voss; Susan J. Helms
- Landing: William M. Shepherd; Yuri P. Gidzenko; Sergei K. Krikalev
- EVAs: 2
- EVA duration: 15 hours, 17 minutes; 1st EVA: 8 hours, 56 minutes; 2nd EVA: 6 hours, 21 minutes

Start of mission
- Launch date: 8 March 2001, 11:42:09 UTC (6:42:09 am EST)
- Launch site: Kennedy, LC-39B

End of mission
- Landing date: 21 March 2001, 07:31:41 UTC (2:31:41 am EST)
- Landing site: Kennedy, SLF Runway 15

Orbital parameters
- Reference system: Geocentric orbit
- Regime: Low Earth orbit
- Perigee altitude: 370 km (230 mi)
- Apogee altitude: 381 km (237 mi)
- Inclination: 51.5°
- Period: 92.1 minutes

Docking with ISS
- Docking port: Destiny forward
- Docking date: 10 March 2001, 06:38 UTC
- Undocking date: 19 March 2001, 04:32 UTC
- Time docked: 8 days, 21 hours, 54 minutes
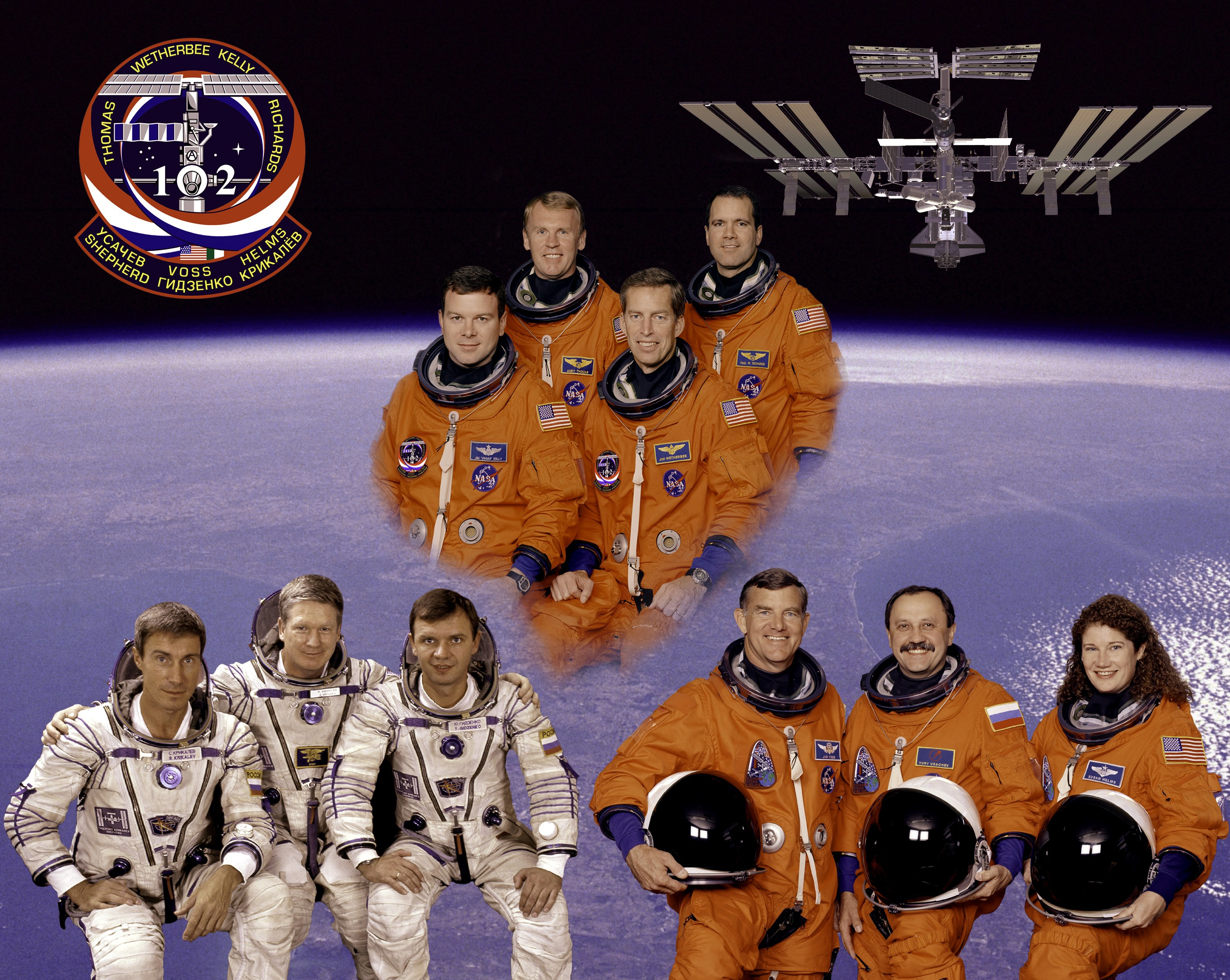
- Mission patch Top group, from left: Kelly, Thomas, Wetherbee and Richards; Bottom left is the landing Expedition 1 crew, from left: Krikalev, Shepherd and Gidzenko; Bottom right is the launching Expedition 2 crew, from left: Voss, Usachov and Helms Space Shuttle program

STS-102 was a Space Shuttle mission to the International Space Station (ISS) flown by Space Shuttle Discovery and launched from Kennedy Space Center, Florida. STS-102 flew in March 2001; its primary objectives were resupplying the ISS and rotating the Expedition 1 and Expedition 2 crews. It was Discovery's 29th flight. The first EVA performed on the mission, at eight hours and 56 minutes, held the title of the longest spacewalk ever undertaken until the 17th of December 2024 when it was surpassed by Cai Xuzhe and Song Lingdong during the Shenzhou 19 spaceflight.

== Crew ==
Position	Launching crew	Landing crew
Commander	(United States) Jim Wetherbee; Fifth spaceflight	
Pilot	(United States) James Kelly; First spaceflight	
Mission Specialist 1	(United States) / (Australia) Andy Thomas; Third spaceflight	
Mission Specialist 2 Flight Engineer	(United States) Paul Richards; Only spaceflight	
Mission Specialist 3	(Russia) Yuri V. Usachov; Expedition 2 Fourth and last spaceflight	(United States) William Shepherd; Expedition 1 Fourth and last spaceflight
Mission Specialist 4	(United States) James Voss; Expedition 2 Fifth and last spaceflight	(Russia) Yuri Gidzenko; Expedition 1 Second spaceflight
Mission Specialist 5	(United States) Susan Helms; Expedition 2 Fifth and last spaceflight	(Russia) Sergei Krikalev; Expedition 1 Fifth spaceflight

=== Crew seat assignments ===
Seat	Launch	Landing	Seats 1–4 are on the flight deck. Seats 5–8 are on the mid-deck. Seat 8 was located to the starboard (right) side of Seat 7.
1	Wetherbee		Seats 1–4 are on the flight deck. Seats 5–8 are on the mid-deck. Seat 8 was located to the starboard (right) side of Seat 7.
2	Kelly		Seats 1–4 are on the flight deck. Seats 5–8 are on the mid-deck. Seat 8 was located to the starboard (right) side of Seat 7.
3	Thomas	Unused	Seats 1–4 are on the flight deck. Seats 5–8 are on the mid-deck. Seat 8 was located to the starboard (right) side of Seat 7.
4	Richards		Seats 1–4 are on the flight deck. Seats 5–8 are on the mid-deck. Seat 8 was located to the starboard (right) side of Seat 7.
5	Voss	Thomas	Seats 1–4 are on the flight deck. Seats 5–8 are on the mid-deck. Seat 8 was located to the starboard (right) side of Seat 7.
6	Helms	Krikalyov	Seats 1–4 are on the flight deck. Seats 5–8 are on the mid-deck. Seat 8 was located to the starboard (right) side of Seat 7.
7	Usachov	Gidzenko	Seats 1–4 are on the flight deck. Seats 5–8 are on the mid-deck. Seat 8 was located to the starboard (right) side of Seat 7.
8	Unused	Shepherd	Seats 1–4 are on the flight deck. Seats 5–8 are on the mid-deck. Seat 8 was located to the starboard (right) side of Seat 7.

Unique to this flight, Shepherd, Gidzenko, and Krikalev were all seated together on the mid-deck in special "recumbent couches" that allowed them to stay in a laid-back reclining position during landing, instead of the usual upright seats. It was thought that after their four months in space, their bodies would be deconditioned and the recumbent position would minimize the impacts of returning to a gravity environment. Because of the special seats, Thomas moved to the normal number 5 seat on the mid-deck to operate the side hatch as necessary. Future shuttle missions would not use the recumbent couches.

== Spacewalks ==
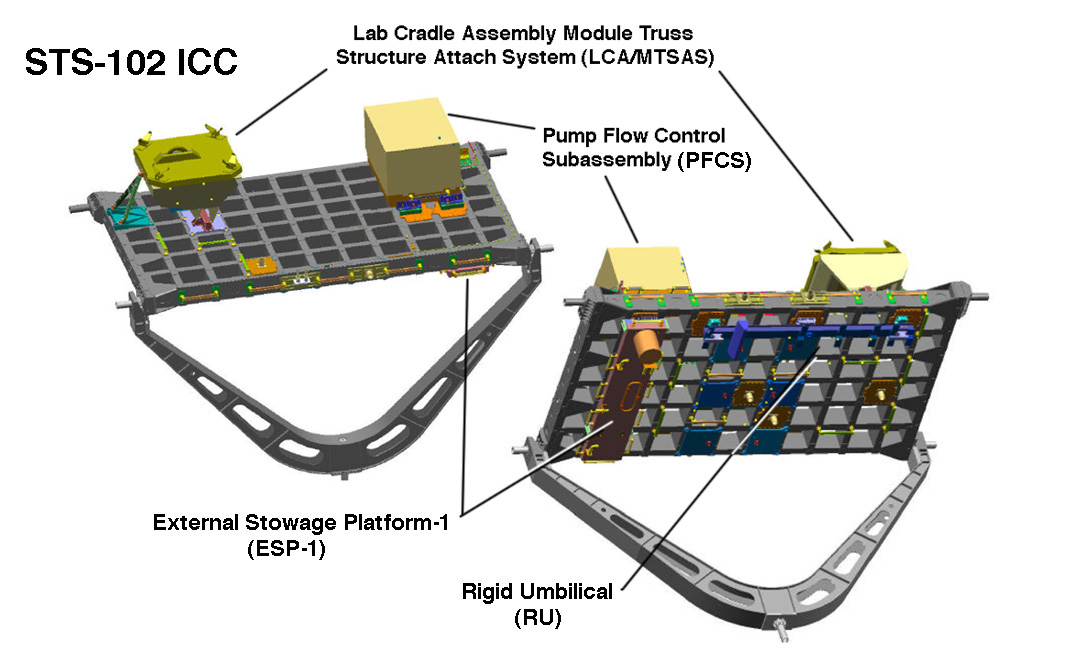
ICC STS-102

EVA 1

- Personnel: Voss and Helms
- Start: 11 March 2001, 05:12 UTC
- End: 11 March 2001, 14:08 UTC
- Duration: 8 hours, 56 minutes

EVA 2

- Personnel: Thomas and Richards
- Start:13 March 2001, 05:23 UTC
- End: 13 March 2001, 11:44 UTC
- Duration: 6 hours, 21 minutes

== Mission highlights ==
Space Station Assembly Flight ISS-5A.1 was the first use of the Multi Purpose Logistics Module (Leonardo) to bring supplies to the station. The steel modules were equipped with up to 16 International Standard Payload Racks for installation in the US Lab. Also carried an Integrated Cargo Carrier (ICC). The ICC had the External Stowage Platform-1 mounted on its underside. ESP-1 was placed on the port side of 'Destiny' as a storage location for orbital replacement units. The mission also included two spacewalks to relocate the units carried up by the ICC to the Destiny module exterior.

== Wake-up calls ==
NASA began a tradition of playing music to astronauts during the Gemini program, which was first used to wake up a flight crew during Apollo 15. Each track is specially chosen, often by their families, and usually has a special meaning to an individual member of the crew, or is applicable to their daily activities.

Flight Day	Song	Artist/Composer
Day 2	"Living the Life"	Rockit Scientists
Day 4	"Nothing's Gonna Stop Us Now"	Starship
Day 6	"From a Distance"	Nanci Griffith
Day 7	"Free Fallin'"	Tom Petty & the Heartbreakers
Day 8	"Should I Stay or Should I Go"	The Clash
Day 12	"Moscow Windows"	Unknown

== See also ==
- List of human spaceflights
- List of International Space Station spacewalks
- List of Space Shuttle missions
- List of spacewalks and moonwalks 1965–1999
- Outline of space science
