= Integrated cargo carrier =

Space Shuttle module

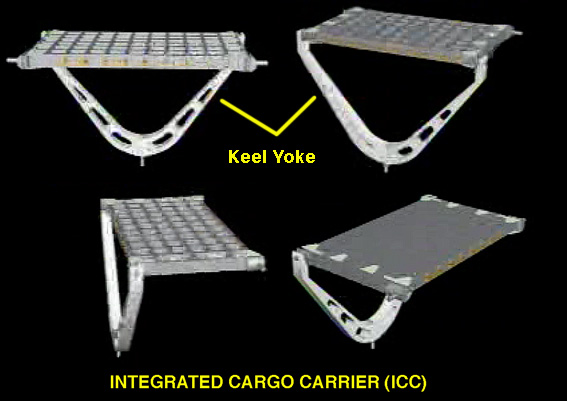
Integrated cargo carrier structure

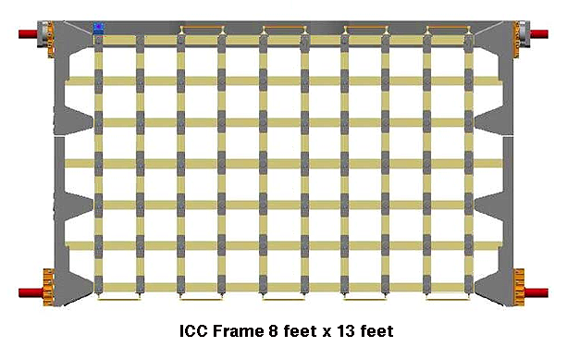
ICC frame

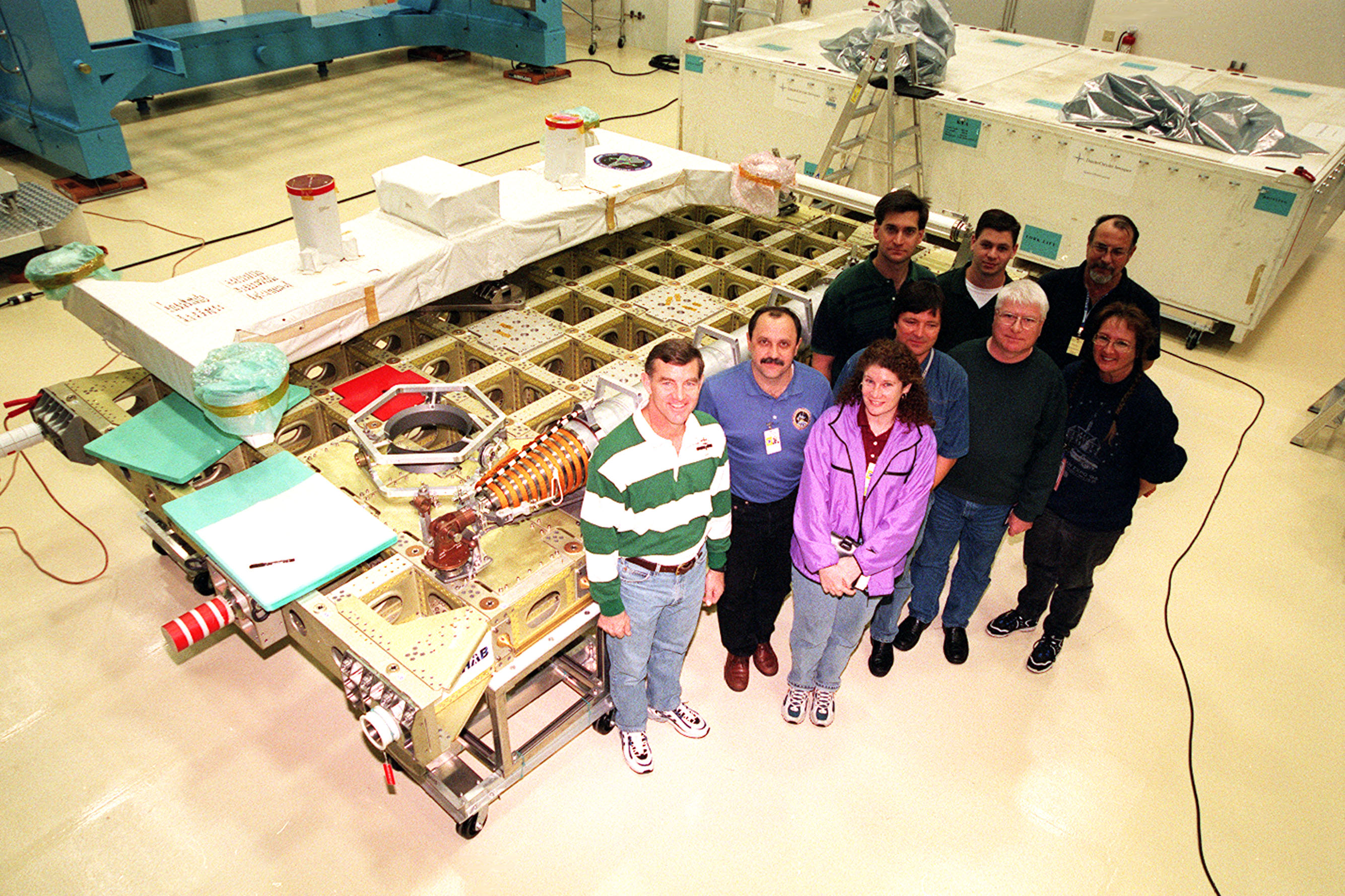
Astronauts and technicians give a sense of scale to the ICC

Integrated Cargo Carrier (ICC) was a project, started in 1997 by the companies Spacehab and Airbus DS Space Systems (formerly Astrium North America), to develop a family of flight proven and certified cross-the-bay cargo carriers designed to fly inside the Space Shuttle cargo bay, installed either horizontally or vertically, and able to carry up to 8000 lbs. of unpressurized cargo into orbit. Airbus owns the ICC fleet of carriers.

The ICC carriers flew on 12 Space Shuttle missions between 1999 and 2010 under NASA's Cargo Mission Contract contributing to the construction, supply and maintenance of the International Space Station (ISS), transporting more than 50 unpressurized cargo elements (over 34,000 pounds) into orbit and providing for permanent attachment of two External Stowage Platforms (ESP-2 and ESP-3) to the ISS.

Airbus' former Cape Canaveral integration facility, which was located at Astrotech's processing facility (formerly SPACEHAB Payload Processing Facility (SPPF)) provided for the physical integration of cargoes to the ICC and subsequent transport to Kennedy Space Center for orbiter installation. Due to its modular design and versatility, options to adapt the ICC design to new commercial orbital space transportation vehicles exist.

== Variations ==
Four types of ICC carriers have flown into orbit aboard the Space Shuttle:

- ICC-G (Generic)

The ICC-G is a horizontal cross-bay carrier consisting primarily of two components:

1. A riveted, aluminum grid-type pallet structure, called the Unpressurized Cargo Pallet (UCP) and
2. A keel yoke, called Keel Yoke Assembly (KYA).

The UCP is the primary structural element of the ICC that provides structural support for payload items carried in the unpressurized volume of the Orbiter’s cargo bay. The ICC-G UCP's dimensions are approx. 14 feet (width) × 8.5 feet (length) × 10 inches (thick). Cargoes can be mounted on both faces of the UCP. The KYA is a U-shaped structure whose primary purpose is to transfer UCP loads to the Orbiter via longeron and keel trunnions. The KYA’s design allowed it to be installed under pressurized tunnel sections in the Orbiter payload bay, thereby allowing the ICC-G to be used in conjunction with a SPACEHAB pressurized module. The ICC-G flew on seven Space Shuttle missions: STS-96/2A.1, STS-101/2A.2a, STS-106/2A.2b, STS-102/5A.1, STS-105/7A.1, STS-121/ULF1.1 and STS-116/12A.1.

- ICC-GD (Generic Deployable)

The ICC-GD is the deployable version of the ICC-G. It consists of a UCP and a KYA (same dimensions as for ICC-G), both outfitted with deployment hardware including grapple fixtures, scuff plates and a deployment kit to allow UCP separation from the KYA. The UCP is deployed while the KYA remains in the Orbiter cargo bay. On-orbit, the UCP can be removed from the Orbiter payload bay, used as a payload / experiment platform, and returned to the payload bay on the same or a subsequent flight. Two ICC-GDs were launched and permanently attached to the ISS as External Stowage Platforms, ESP-2 (launched on STS-114/LF1) and ESP-3 (launched on STS-118/13A.1). Both ICC-GDs were deployed with Extra-vehicular activity (EVA) assistance via the orbiter's and/or ISSs robotic arm (Canadarm and Canadarm2, respectively). The ESP-2 and ESP-3 provides electrical power to the ORUs while attached to the ISS via the ICC-GDs Power Distribution Unit (PDU) and power cable/PCAS (Passive Common Attach System) interface. The ICC-GD flew on the Shuttle missions STS-114/LF1 (ESP-2) and STS-118/13A.1 (ESP-3).

- ICC-L (Light)

The ICC-L is the principal one half of an ICC-G, using the removable core section from the not-flown ICC-V (Vertical) rotated into a horizontal orientation and combining it with the KYA. The ICC-L flew once on STS-122/1E.

- ICC-VLD (Vertical Light Deployable)

The ICC-VLD is a derivative of the not-flown ICC-V. Due to the modular pallet design of the ICC-V which is composed of one central core section and two identical outer sections that bolt to the upper and lower edges of the core section, the ICC-VLD is converted from the octagonal-shaped ICC-V design by removing the top section and converted from a non-deployable configuration to a deployable configuration by adding a grapple fixture and scuff plates. The ICC-VLD flew on STS-127/2JA and STS-132/ULF4. During both missions, the ICC-VLD was deployed from the orbiter's cargo bay and transferred to the ISS via the orbiter's robotic arm Canadarm and subsequent handover to the Space Station's robotic arm Canadarm2. While grappled to the Space Station's robotic arm, the ICC-VLD's cargo elements, called Orbital Replacement Units ORUs were transferred with Extra-vehicular activity (EVA) assistance to the respective locations on the ISS. The ICC-VLD provided heater power and electrical connections for the ORUs while inside the cargo bay or grappled by the robotic arm. Upon completion of ORU removal and replacement activities (R&R), the ICC-VLDs were both berthed back into the orbiter and returned to earth. The ICC-VLD flew on the Shuttle missions STS-127/2JA and STS-132/ULF4.

Cargo items were installed to the UCP either via the Passive FRAM (Flight Releasable Attachment Mechanisms) Adapter Plate (PFRAM) (for ORUs) or mounted directly to the UCP's node hole or peripheral hole pattern. The general ICC design also incorporates avionic systems allowing for on-board data acquisition/processing/WLAN via integrated computer as well as power distribution for the cargoes via Power Distribution Unit (PDU) while installed on the ISS, on board a launch vehicle or grappled by a robotic arm.

== ICC Flights ==
Flight	Launch Date	Payload/Cargo Manifest (Shuttle and ICC)
STS-96/2A.1	05/27/99	SPACEHAB DM, ICC-G (w/ STRELA, ORU Transfer Device (both up) & SHOSS Box up/down)
STS-101/2A.2a	05/19/00	SPACEHAB DM, ICC-G (w/ STRELA (up), SHOSS Box & SOAR both up/down)
STS-106/2A.2b	09/08/00	SPACEHAB DM, ICC-G (w/ SOAR & SHOSS Box both up/down)
STS-102/5A.1	03/08/01	MPLM-1 ‘Leonardo’, ICC-G (w/ ESP-1, PFCS, LCA, EAS, RU all up)
STS-105/7A.1	08/10/01	MPLM-1 ‘Leonardo’, ICC-G (w/ EAS up & MISSE 1 & 2 all up)
STS-114/LF1	07/26/05	MPLM-2 ‘Raffaello’, ICC-GD/ESP-2 (w/ VSSA, MBSU, FHRC, UTA, all up as ESP-2 stayed on-orbit)
STS-121/ULF1.1	07/04/06	MPLM-1 ‘Leonardo’, ICC-G (w/ PM (up) & TUS-RA (new up/old down), and FGB)
STS-116/12A.1	12/09/06	ITS P5, Spacehab LSM, ICC-G (w/ SMDP2/3/4, SMDP Adapter up & STP-H2 launch canister up/down)
STS-118/13A.1	08/08/07	ITS S5, Spacehab LSM, ICC-GD/ESP-3 (w/ P/R-J, CMG, NTA, BCDU, ATA FSE all up as ESP-3 stayed on-orbit)
STS-122/1E	02/07/08	COF ‘Columbus’ & ICC-L (w/ EuTEF & SOLAR (both up) & NTA up/down)
STS-127/2J/A	07/15/09	JEM EF & ELM-ES, ICC-VLD (w/ SGANT, LDU, PM (all 3 up) & 6 P6 Batteries (new up/old down))
STS-132/ULF-4	05/14/10	MRM-1, ICC-VLD (w/ EOTP, SGANT & Boom (up), 6 P6 Batteries (new up/old down))

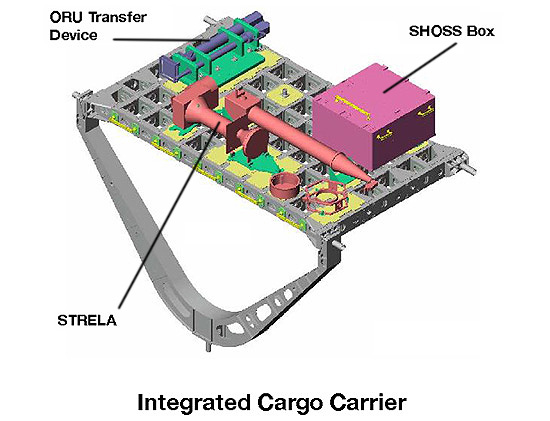
ICC STS-96

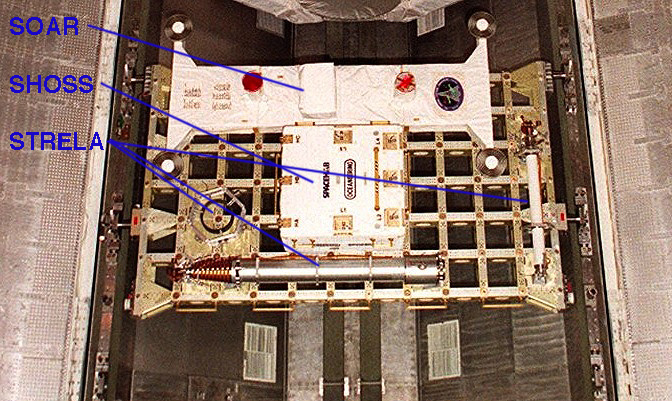
ICC STS-101

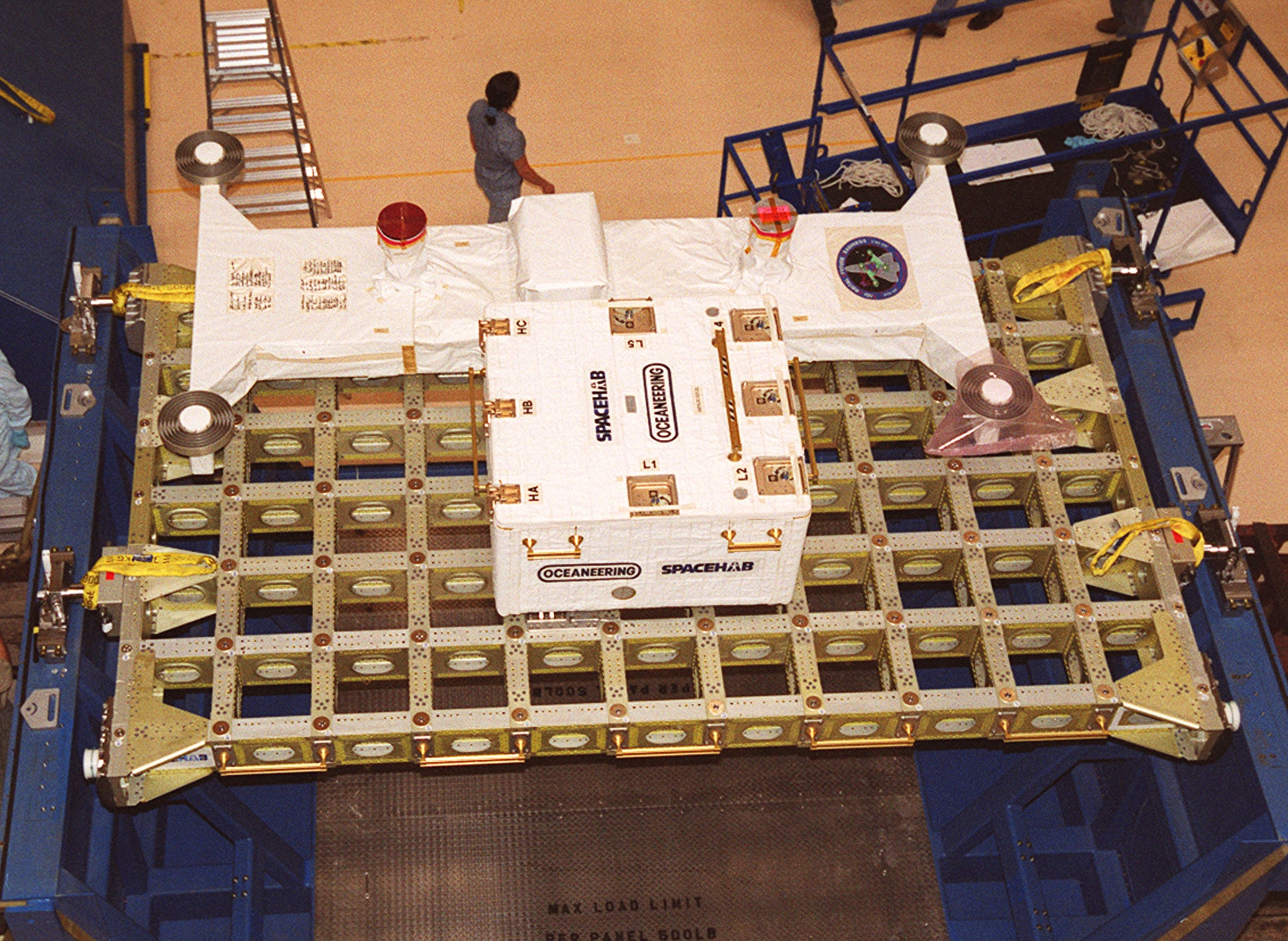
ICC STS-106

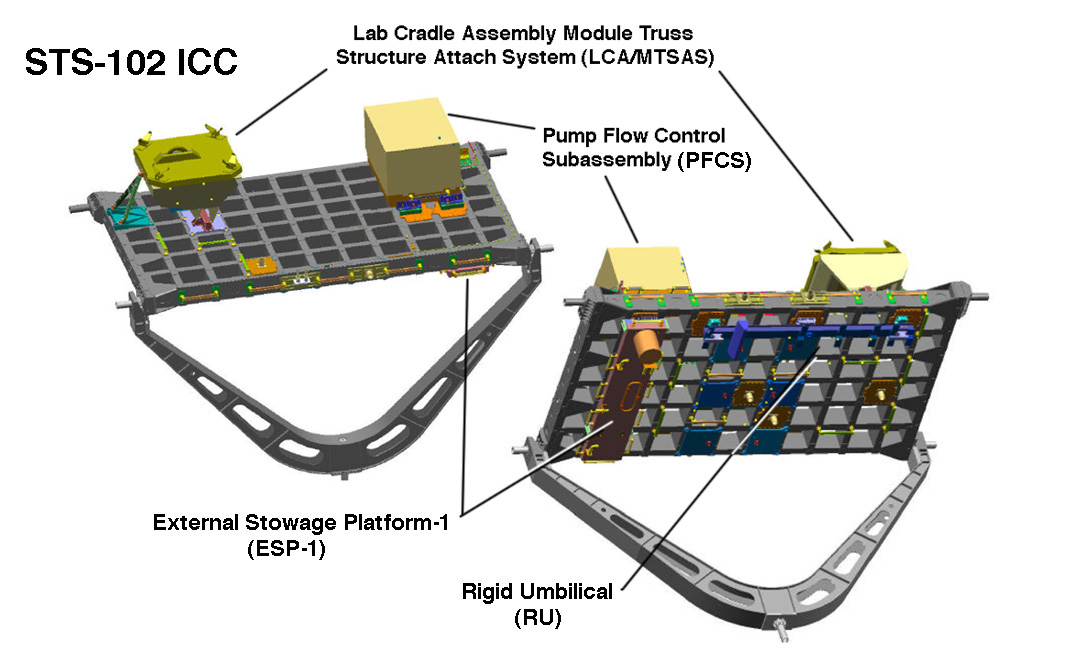
ICC STS-102

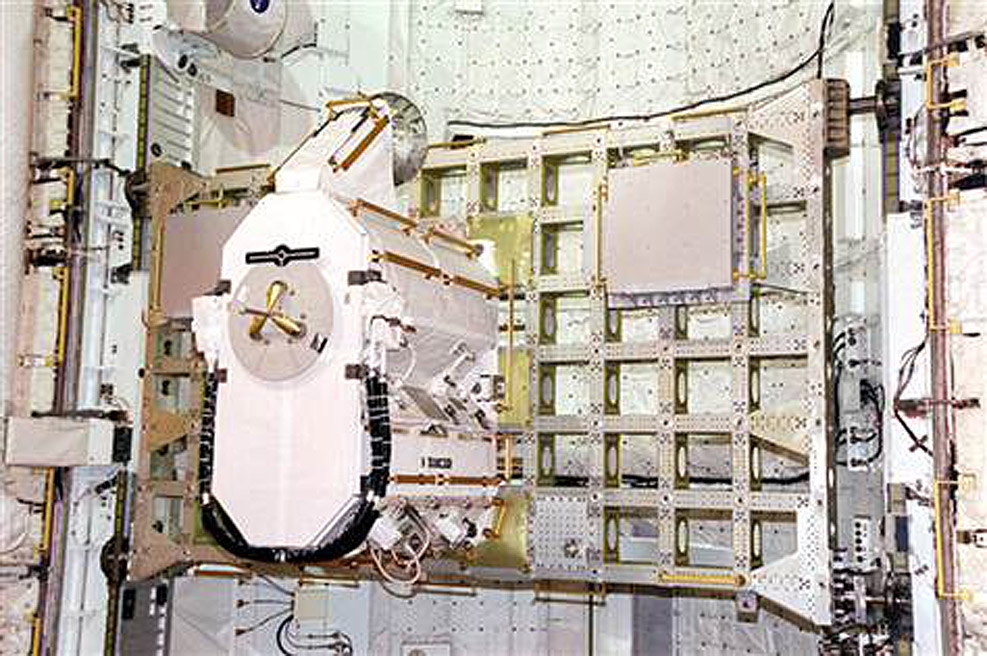
ICC STS-105
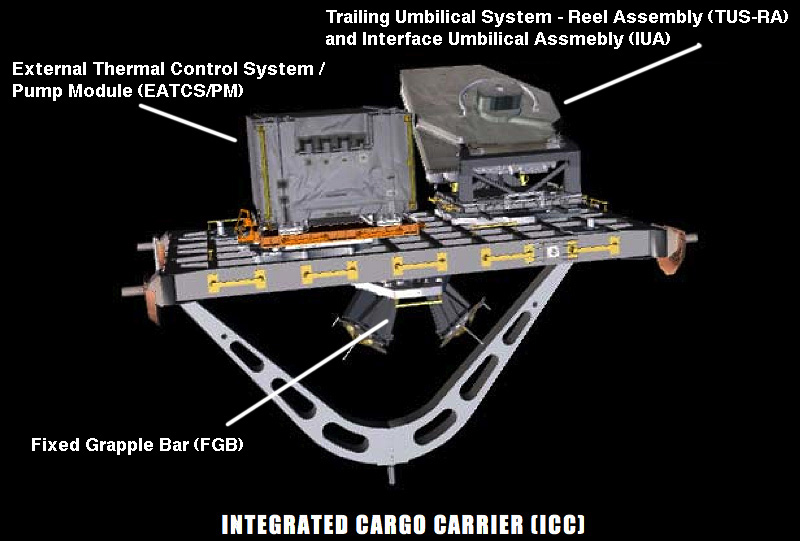
ICC STS-121

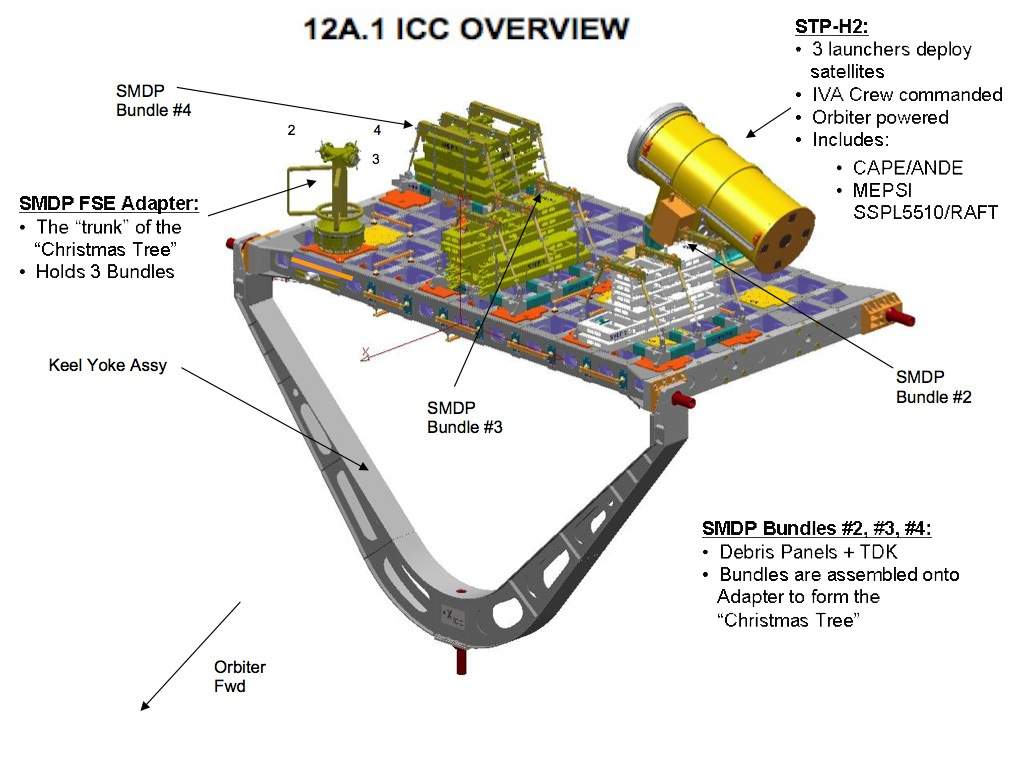
ICC STS-116

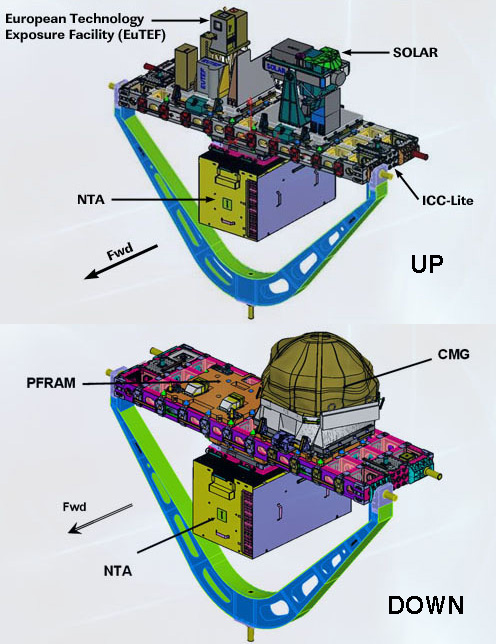
ICC-Lite STS-122

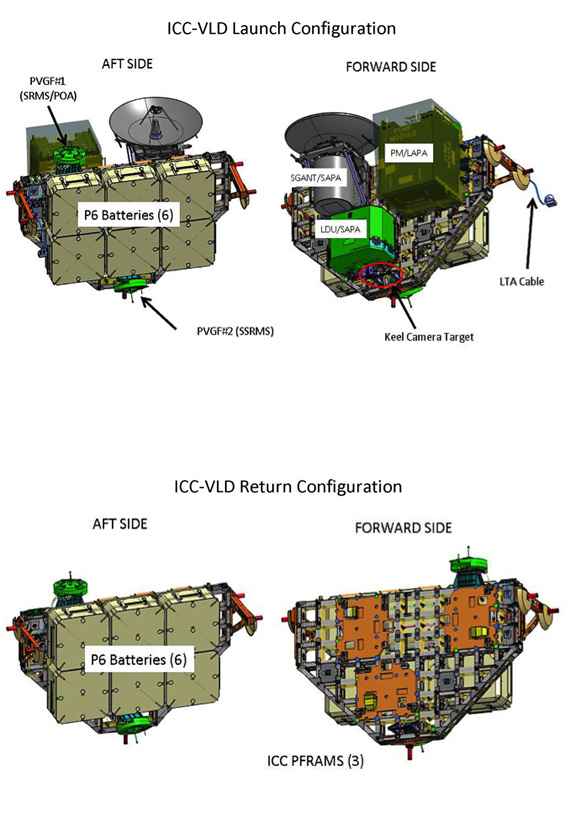
ICC-VLD1 STS-127

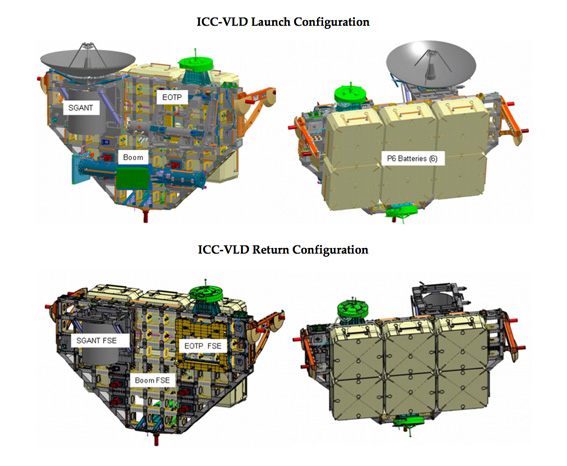
ICC-VLD2 STS-132

== See also ==
- External Stowage Platform
- International Space Station
- Space Shuttle
