= Derek Buzasi =

American astronomer

Derek L. Buzasi
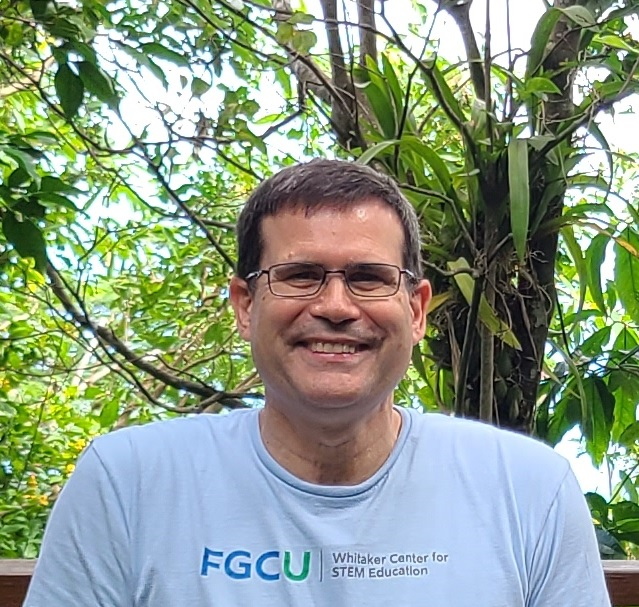
- Buzasi in December 2023
- Education: BA Physics 1985 University of Chicago; PhD Astronomy 1989 Pennsylvania State University; MS Marine Engineering Management 2015 American Military University
- Known for: 'Salvaging' WIRE spacecraft as the first orbital asteroseismology mission
- Scientific career
- Fields: Stellar magnetic field; Stellar observations; Asteroseismology; WIRE; Kepler space telescope; TESS
- Thesis: “The Nature of Activity in RS CVn Systems” (1989)
- Doctoral advisor: Lawrence W. Ramsey
- Website: derekastro.github.io

Derek Buzasi is an American astronomer who joined the Department of Astronomy and Astrophysics at the University of Chicago as a Senior Instructional Professor in January 2025. Prior to that, he held the position of Whitaker Eminent Scholar in Science in the College of Arts and Sciences at Florida Gulf Coast University, in Fort Myers, Florida, from October, 2012 through December 2024. He is an active member of both the American Astronomical Society (AAS) and the International Astronomical Union (IAU). Buzasi also served as the head of the FGCU Stellar Research Group, leading a NASA-funded design study for MAGIC, a multichannel Near-ultraviolet (NUV) SmallSat mission that will detect and characterize oscillations in massive stars. He served as a Calibration Scientist for the Space Telescope Imaging Spectrograph (STIS), as deputy project scientist for the Orbital Observatory International Ultraviolet Explorer (IUE) and as project scientist for the orbital observatory Extreme Ultraviolet Explorer (EUVE). In the area of Science Policy, Buzasi serves on NASA's UV Science and Technology Interest Group (UV STIG) and NASA's Stars Science Interest Group (Stars SIG) and on the American Astronomical Society's demographics committee. Buzasi has also served on the Science Team of the Kepler orbital observatory and is the co-chair of the Transiting Exoplanet Survey Satellite (TESS) Data for Asteroseismology group, a subgroup of the TESS Asteroseismic Science Operations Center (TASOC). In addition, he is a member of the PLATO consortium and the NewAthena Science Community.

== Education ==
In 1985 Buzasi graduated from the University of Chicago with a Bachelor of Arts degree in physics. In 1989 he was awarded a Doctor of Philosophy degree (Ph.D.) in astronomy from the Pennsylvania State University. His dissertation advisor was Prof. Lawrence W. Ramsey, dissertation topic: “The Nature of Activity in RS CVn Systems." Buzasi also became a (primarily reservist) engineering duty officer in the US Navy in 1996 and currently holds the rank of Captain (ret), USN. In connection with his naval service, in 2015 he was awarded a Master of Science degree in marine engineering management from the American Military University.

== Research ==
Buzasi's research interests include computational astrophysics, helioseismology, asteroseismology, oscillations in massive stars, characterization of solar analogs, gyrochronology and binary systems, stellar magnetic field structures and interactions in active stars, and astronomical instrumentation. He has authored more than 250 research papers on these topics.

== Repurposing the WIRE Mission ==
In 1999, while working at the Space Sciences Lab at Berkeley, Buzasi conceived of a way to use the small thermoelectrically-cooled star tracker on the Wide Field Infrared Explorer orbital observatory, which had just experienced a catastrophic loss of the solid hydrogen coolant for its main mirror, to conduct the first space-based asteroseismology research campaign. The WIRE satellite was at that point on the brink of being declared a "total loss of mission." Buzasi was not affiliated with the WIRE team (he was an Assistant Research Scientist on the Cosmic Origins Spectrograph project at the Space Sciences Laboratory at the University of California, Berkeley), but his research interests included both asteroseismology and detetctor design. He contacted NASA's Office of Space Science with the proposal, and NASA put him in charge of the star-tracker asteroseismology program. WIRE's star-tracker made groundbreaking observations of the brightest stars, and Buzasi scheduled observing requests for—and made the data and his data reduction pipeline freely available to—other astronomers, so that the WIRE mission, despite the loss of its infrared capability, provided data that resulted in the publication of more than 70 professional research papers. Although he started making WIRE data available in 2000, doctoral dissertations (up to 2020) and publications are still coming out each year (through 2024) that rely in part on WIRE asteroseismology data. This serendipitous asteroseismology mission affected both the asteroseismology and exoplanets communities for decades: while including undergraduates and graduate students as co-authors in his research team and ensuring their participation in related professional meetings, Buzasi has also served on the Science Team of the Kepler orbital observatory and is the co-chair of the Transiting Exoplanet Survey Satellite (TESS) Data for Asteroseismology group, a subgroup of the TESS Asteroseismic Science Operations Center (TASOC).
