= ExPRESS Logistics Carrier =

Module on the International Space Station

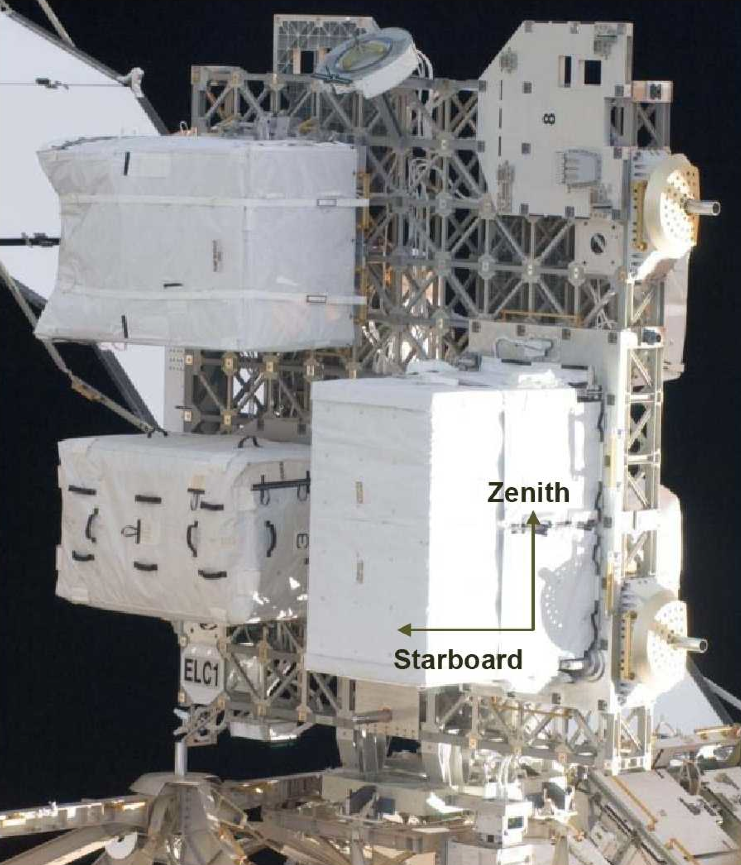
ExPRESS Logistics Carrier number 1

An EXpedite the PRocessing of Experiments to Space Station (ExPRESS) Logistics Carrier (ELC) is an unpressurized attached payload platform for the International Space Station (ISS) that provides mechanical mounting surfaces, electrical power, and command and data handling services for Orbital Replacement Units (ORUs) as well as science experiments on the ISS. The ELCs were developed primarily at the Goddard Space Flight Center in Greenbelt, Maryland, with support from JSC, KSC, and MSFC. ELC was formerly called "Express Pallet" and is the unpressurized counterpart to the pressurized ExPRESS Rack. An ELC provides scientists with a platform and infrastructure to deploy experiments in the vacuum of space without requiring a separate dedicated Earth-orbiting satellite.

ELCs interface directly with the ISS integrated truss common attach system (CAS). The P3 Truss has two such attach points called Unpressurised Cargo Carrier Attachment System (UCCAS) mechanisms, one facing zenith (space facing) called UCCAS-1, the other facing nadir (earth facing) called UCCAS-2. The S3 Truss has four similar locations called Payload Attachment System (PAS) mechanisms, two facing Zenith (PAS-1 and PAS-2), and two facing Nadir (PAS-3 and PAS-4).

== Description ==
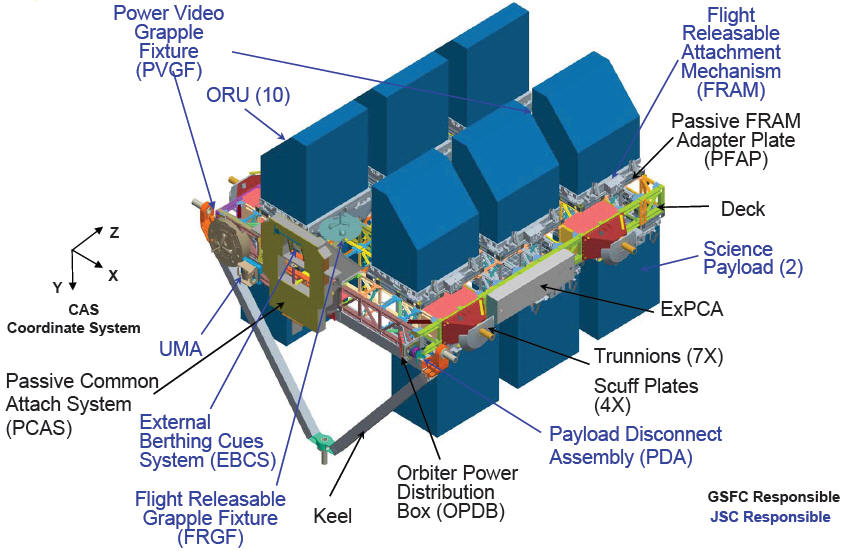
Layout and structure of the ELC

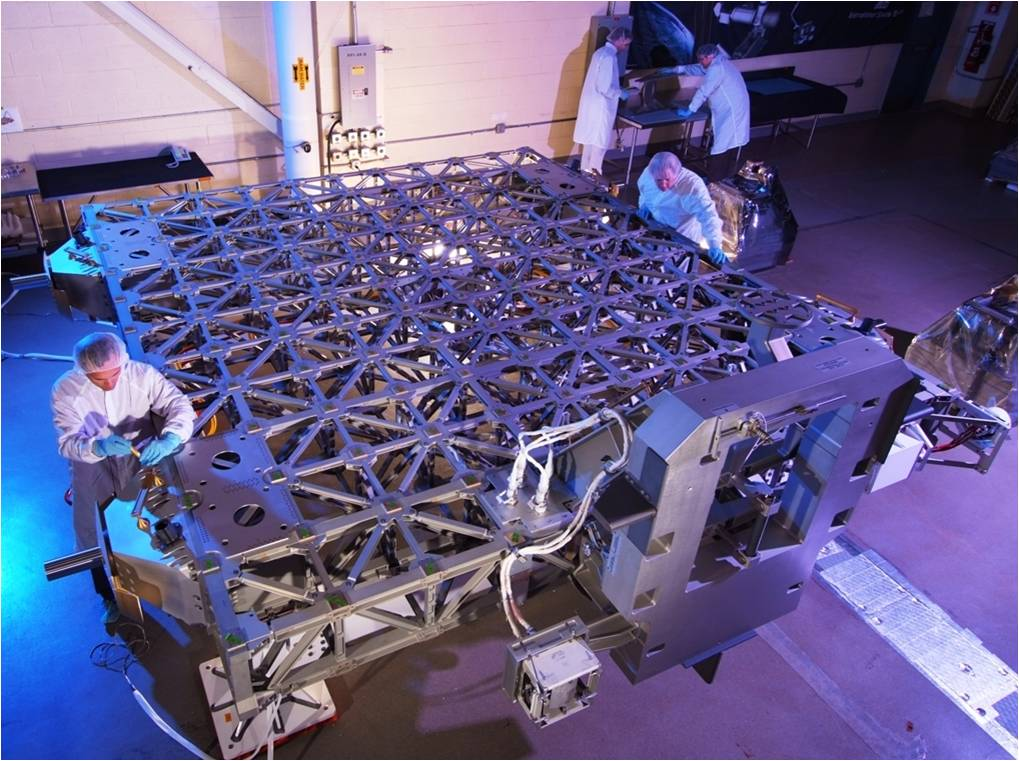
ELC steel framework during final fabrication at GSFC

The ELC are four un-pressurized attached payloads that provides mechanical mounting surfaces, electrical power, and command and data handling services for science experiments on the ISS. The ELCs have a deck size of about 14 feet by 16 feet and spans the width of the space shuttle's payload bay. They are made of steel, coated with UV paint. Each one is capable of providing scientists with a platform and infrastructure to deploy experiments in the vacuum of space without requiring a separate dedicated Earth-orbiting satellite. Each carrier is capable of carrying 9,800 lbs. to orbit and will also serve as parking fixtures for spare ISS hardware (ORUs) which can be retrieved when needed. Experiments are mounted on ExPRESS payload adapters (ExPA) which are about the same size as the FRAMs that hold ORUs.

== Electrical subsystem ExPRESS carrier avionics (ExPCA) ==
Within the electrical subsystem of the ELC, the ExPRESS carrier avionics (ExPCA) provides electrical power distribution to experiments, and data interfaces to the ISS. Within the ExPCA, the ColdFire-based flight computer, software, and related electronics comprise its "flight controller unit" (FCU). The FCU runs the free open-source real-time operating system (RTOS) RTEMS and provides the computing and communication resources as an ELC Command and Data Handling (C&DH) system with the following major goals:

- Provide a low-rate data link (LRDL) interface to ISS to accept commands for the ELC and the resident experiments. The ExPCA is implemented as a remote terminal (RT) on the MIL-STD-1553 "ISS local bus." This interface also returns housekeeping telemetry from the ExPCA and resident experiments to the ISS.
- Provide an LRDL from the ExPCA to the experiments resident on the ELC to forward commands from the ISS to the experiments and to receive telemetry from the experiments for transmission to the ISS. This is another MIL-STD-1553 interface, with the ExPCA acting as the Bus Controller (BC).
- Provide a high-rate data link (HRDL) between the ELC and the ISS. This interface is implemented as a fiber optical data bus with a capacity of up to 95.0 Megabits per second (Mbit/s). The primary function of this interface is the return on high-volume experiment Science data from the resident experiments to the ISS.
- Provide an Ethernet local area network (LAN) between the ELC and the resident experiments up to 6.0 Mbit/s per experiment. The primary function of this interface is the return of science experiment data from to the ISS, relayed through the HRDL.
- Support six analog input channels at each ExPA (ExPRESS payload adapter) location.
- Support six discrete command channels at each ExPA location.

Manifested on ELC-2 was the first ELC-based payload, Materials for ISS Experiment (MISSE-7). mounted on an ExPA.

== ELC launch schedule ==
ELC-1 and ELC-2 were transported to the International Space Station by Space Shuttle Atlantis on mission STS-129 in November 2009. ELC-4 launched on mission STS-133 Discovery on 24 February 2011 and was installed on the station on 27 February. ELC-3 launched on mission STS-134 Endeavour on 16 May 2011 and was installed on the station on 18 May.

The Alpha Magnetic Spectrometer occupies the mounting location intended for ELC-5 on the ISS truss.

Launch date	Mission	Shuttle	ELC
16 November 2009	STS-129 (ISS ULF3)	Atlantis	ELC-1 and ELC-2
24 February 2011	STS-133 (ISS ULF5)	Discovery	ELC-4
16 May 2011	STS-134 (ISS ULF6)	Endeavour	ELC-3

== Locations and components ==
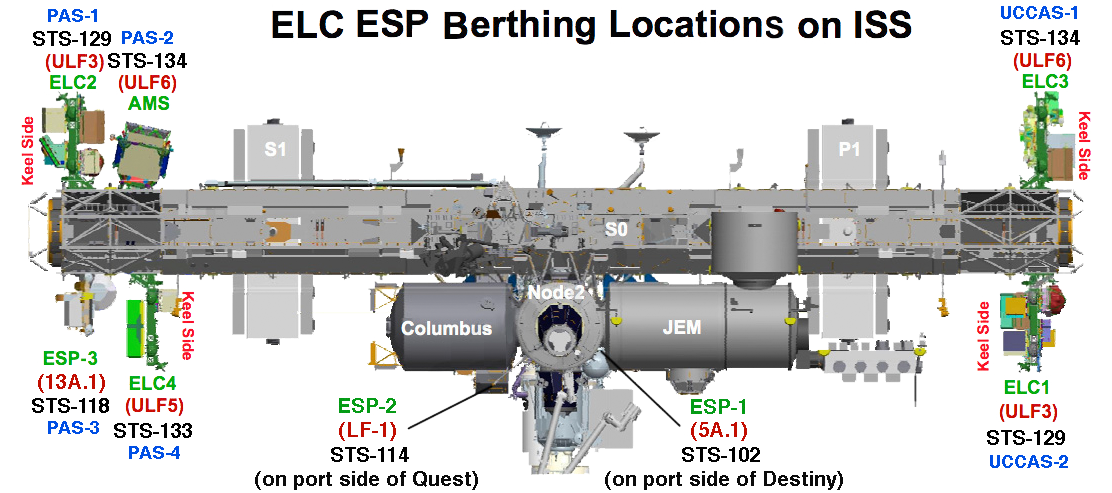
Location of ELCs and ESPs on the International Space Station.

=== ELC-1 ===
ExPRESS Logistics Carrier 1
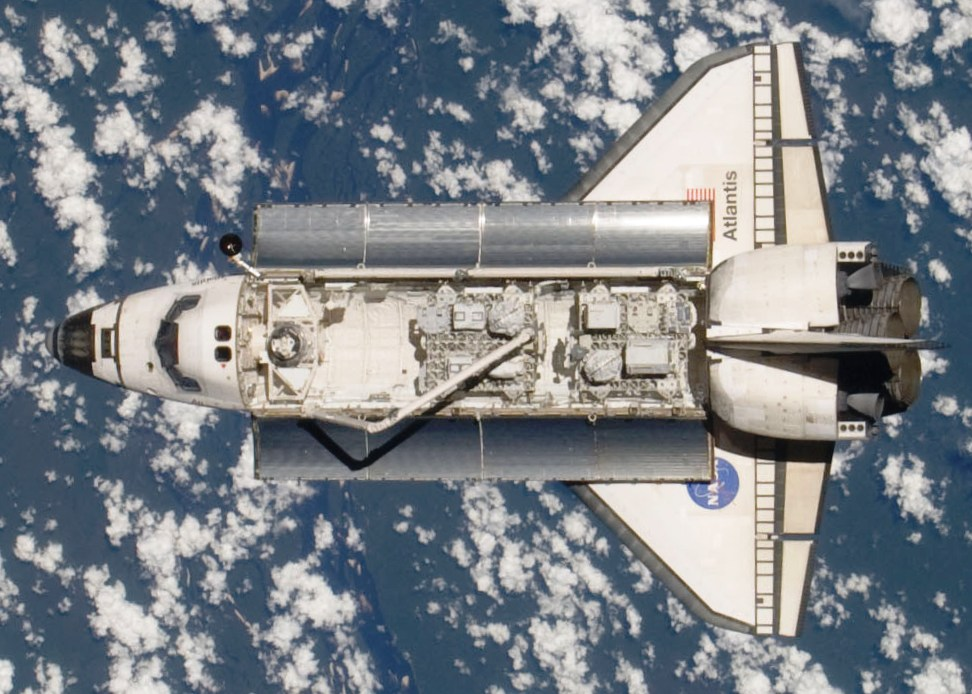
- ELCs 1 & 2 in the Space Shuttle Atlantis cargo bay.

Module statistics
- Part of: International Space Station
- Launch date: 16 November 2009, 19:28:09 UTC
- Launch vehicle: Space Shuttle/STS-129
- Berthed: 18 November 2009, 21:27 at P3 truss
- Mass: 6,280 kg (13,840 lb)

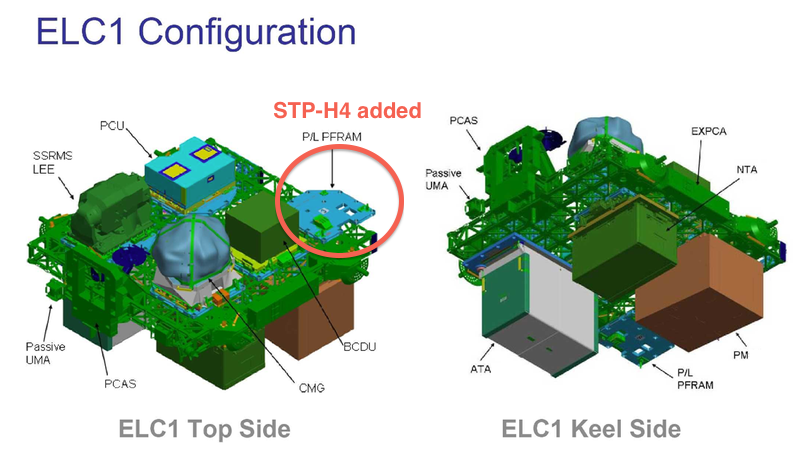
ELC-1 in its launch configuration, note STP-H4 added Aug. 2013

ELC-1 is located on the P3 truss at the UCCAS-2 (nadir, earth facing) site. ELC-1 weighs approx. 13,840 lbs. A FRAM is a Flight Releasable Attachment Mechanism.

- FRAM-1 (top side) Utility Transfer Assembly (UTA), formerly held Latching End Effector (LEE 204) launched on ELC-1
- FRAM-2 (top side) Plasma Contactor Unit (PCU) launched on ELC-1
- FRAM-3 (top side) CLARREO Pathfinder formerly held AWE (placed in SpaceX Dragon CRS 34 trunk for disposal) formerly held STP-H5. (Relocated to ELC 3) Formerly held STP-H4 (delivered by the HTV-4 Exposed Pallet, was placed here by the SSRMS/Dextre Aug. 2013) the payload was removed by SPDM/Dextre on August 27, 2015 and transferred to HTV-5 for disposal. Later held RRM3, delivered by SpaceX Dragon CRS-16 in December 2018, which was relocated to ELC-3 in June 2022.
- FRAM-4 (top side) Formerly held Battery Charger Discharge Unit (BCDU) launched on ELC-1 (was transferred to the P6 Truss during an EVA Oct. 18, 2019). (New BCDU delivered on SpaceX CRS 25 and installed in its place)
- FRAM-5 (top side) Control Moment Gyroscope (CMG SN104) launched on ELC-1
- FRAM-6 (keel side) Nitrogen Tank Assembly (NTA SN0002) launched on ELC-1
- FRAM-7 (keel side) Pump Module (PM SN0007) launched on ELC-1
- FRAM-8 (keel side) EMIT, formerly held OPALS and STP-H5 (moved to FRAM-3 see above) (OPALS placed via Dextre/SSRMS May 7, 2014. Delivered by SpaceX Dragon CRS-3 payload was removed by SPDM/Dextre on March 2, 2017 and stored in the trunk of SpaceX Dragon CRS-10 for disposal.)
- FRAM-9 (keel side) Ammonia Tank Assembly (ATA) launched on ELC-1
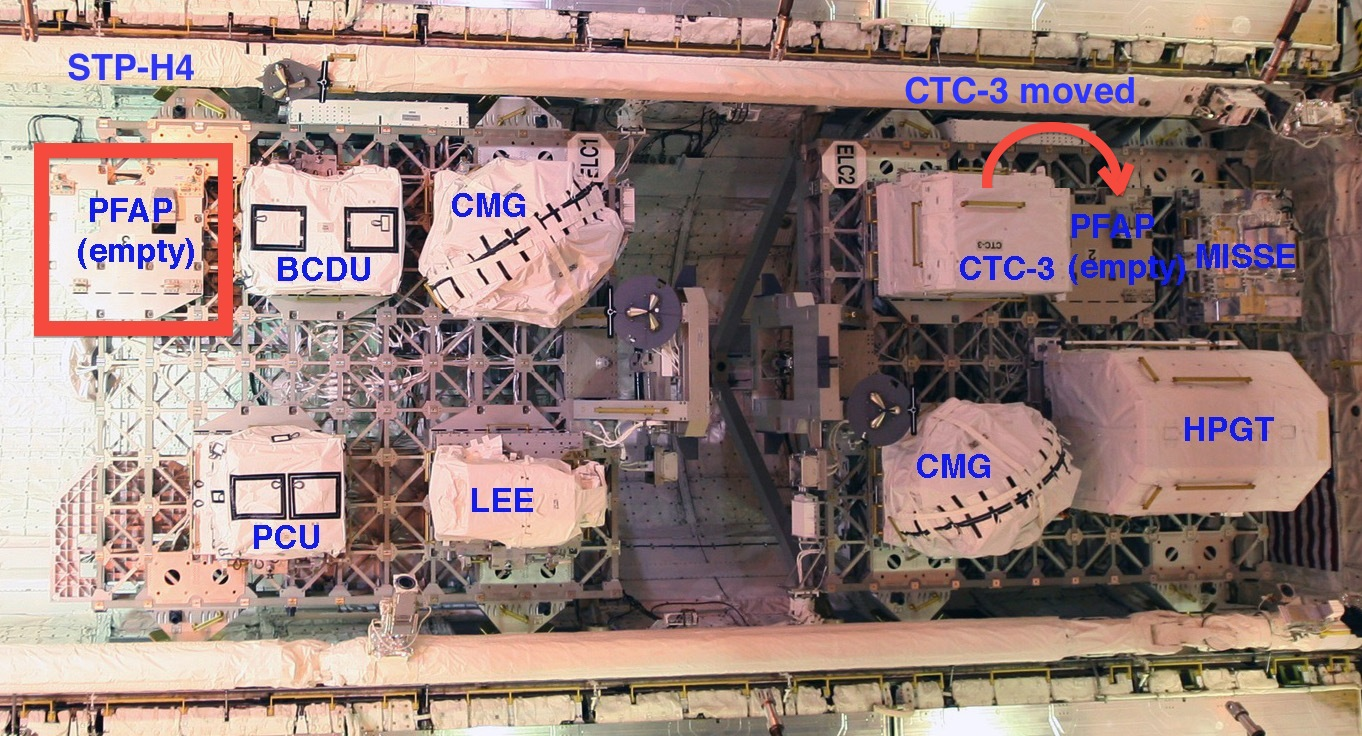
ELC-1 and ELC-2 (top side views) prelaunch, with red changes on orbit.

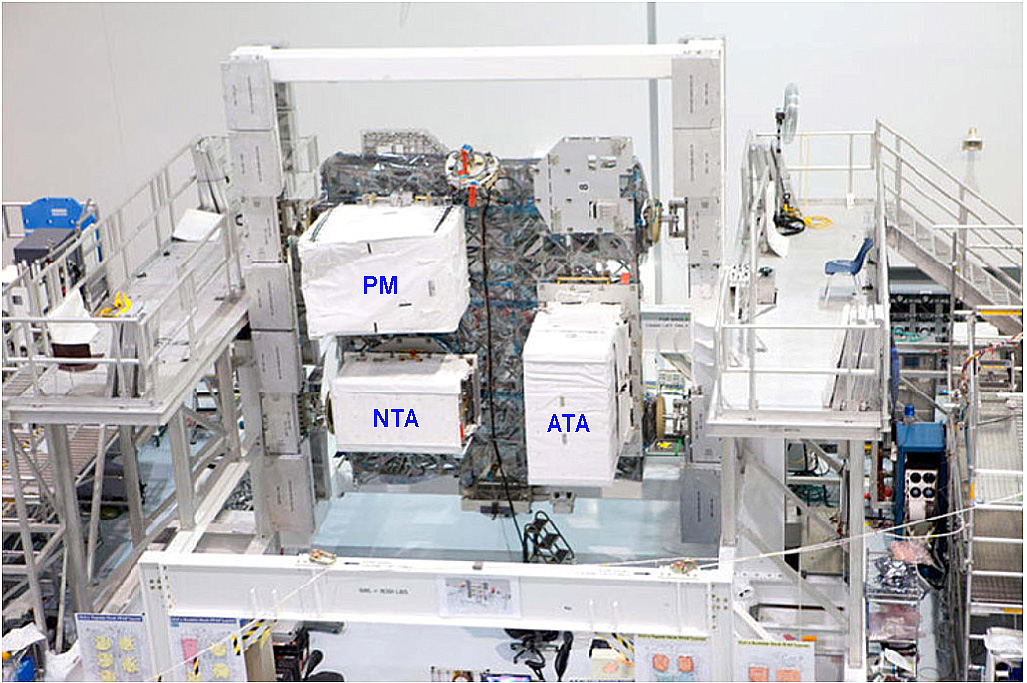
ELC-1 underside view in the SSPF, with labels

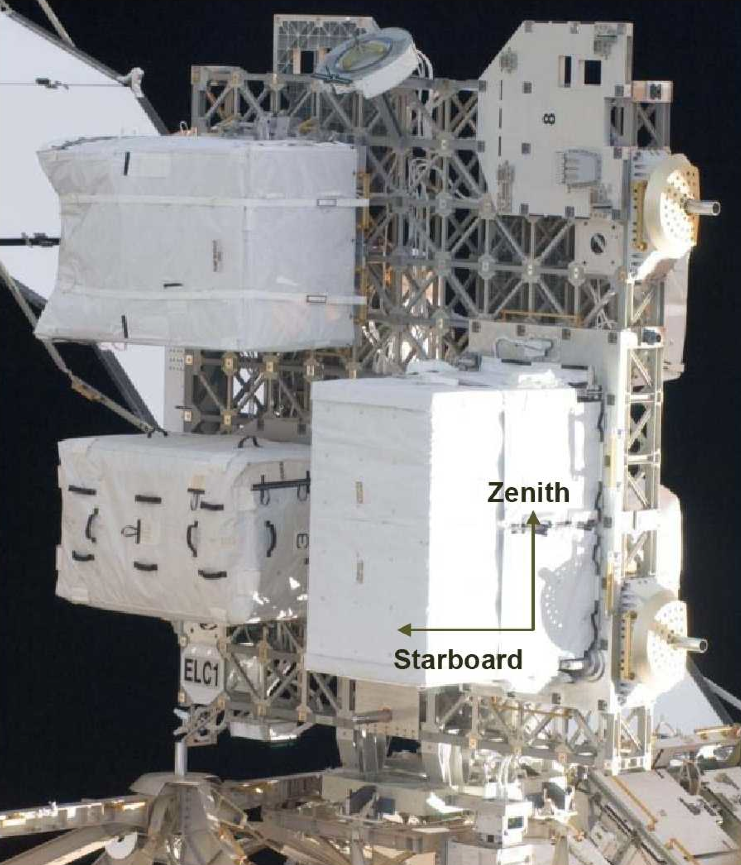
ELC-1 keel side view on orbit

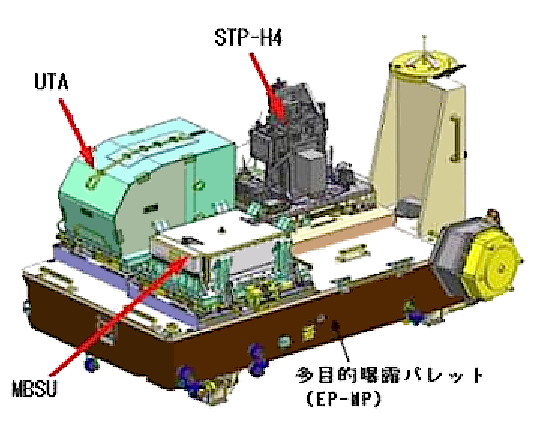
JEM Exposed Platform HTV-4

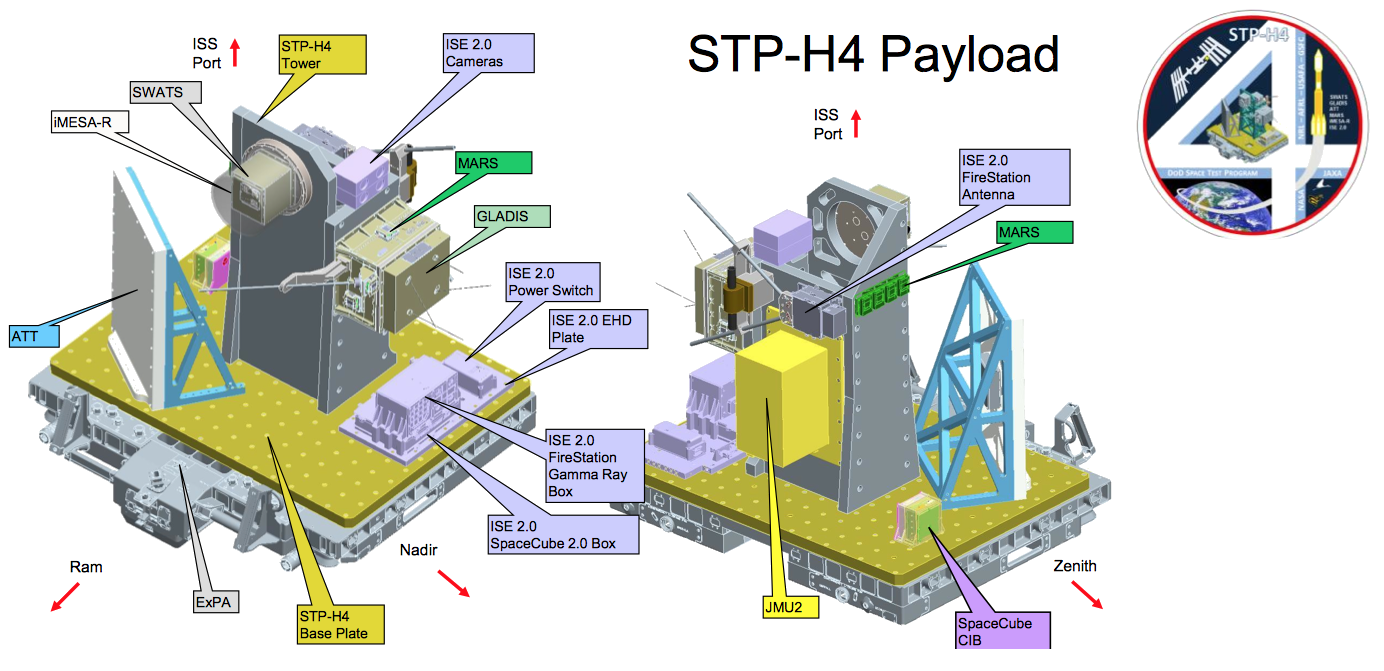
Brazilian STP-H4 Experiment package

=== ELC-2 ===
ExPRESS Logistics Carrier 2
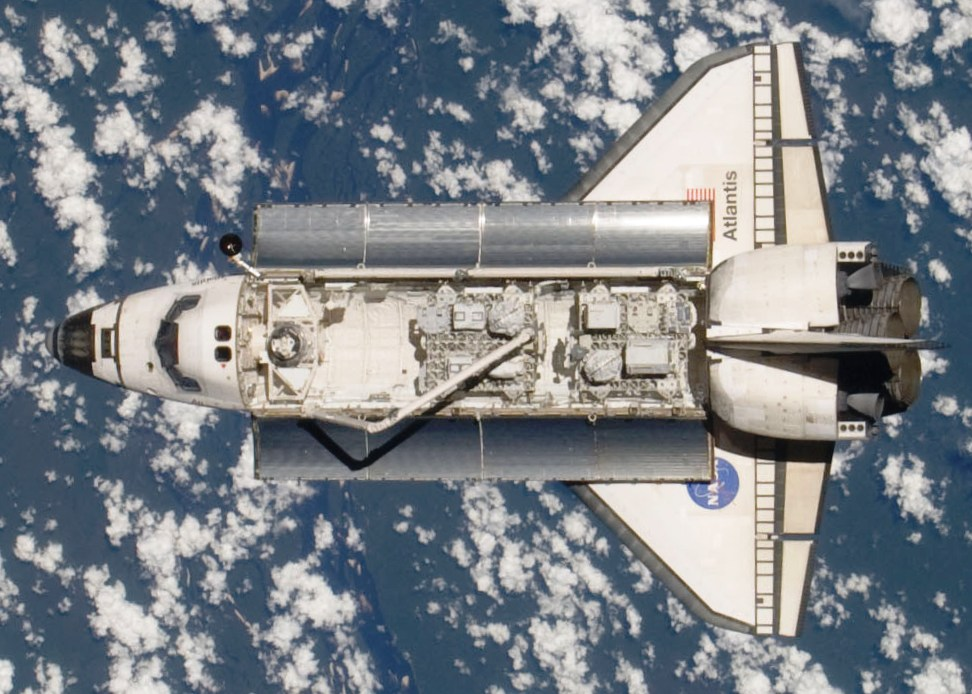
- ELCs 1 & 2 in the Space Shuttle Atlantis cargo bay.

Module statistics
- Part of: International Space Station
- Launch date: 16 November 2009, 19:28:09 UTC
- Launch vehicle: Space Shuttle/STS-129
- Berthed: 21 November 2009, 14:14 at S3 truss
- Mass: 6,100 kg (13,400 lb)

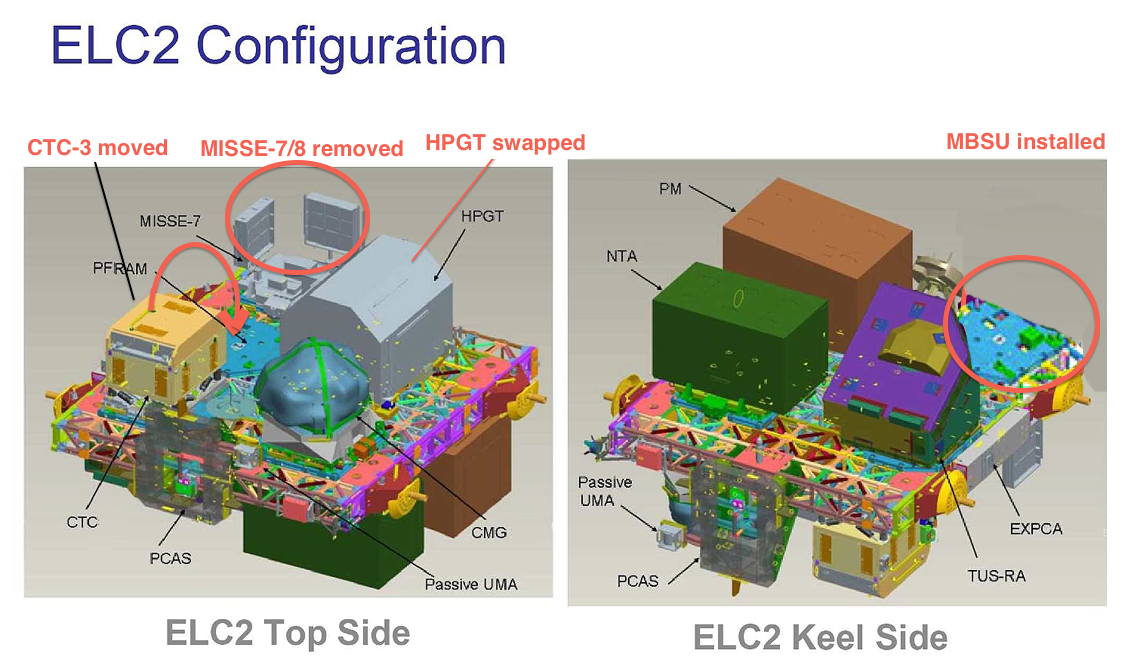
ELC-2 in its launch configuration, note changes since installation

ELC-2 is located on the S3 truss at the PAS-1 (zenith, space facing) site, alongside AMS-2 at PAS-2. ELC-2 weighs approx. 13,400 lbs.

- FRAM-1 (top side) Linear Drive Unit #2 (LDU #2) FRAM originally held DCSU placed here by SPDM from ESP-2 on Jan. 30, 2013. (CTC-3 moved to FRAM-2 for a test of the SPDM December 22/23, 2011)
- FRAM-2 (top side) Direct Current Switching Unit (DCSU #9) FRAM originally held Cargo Transport Container-3 (CTC-3) launched on ELC-2 (moved from FRAM-1 – see above)
- FRAM-3 (top side) MISSE-FF Facility FRAM formerly held an ExPRESS payload adapter (ExPA) as MISSE base - MISSE-8 was removed by the Exp. 36 crew Jul. 2013 (STS-134 added MISSE-8 replacing MISSE-7 which was launched on ELC-2. STS-135 added MISSE-8 'ORMatE-III exposure plate' to the second MISSE mount). (removed by SPDM and stored in the trunk of SpaceX Dragon CRS-10 for disposal after the black box was removed by the crew. MISSE-FF was delivered on SpaceX CRS-14 and installed on April 12, 2018 by SPDM/Dextre to replace the old unit.)
- FRAM-4 (top side) Main Buss Switching Unit Support equipment FRAM originally held Control Moment Gyroscope (CMG SN102) launched on ELC-2
- FRAM-5 (top side) High Pressure Gas Tank #2 (HPGT #2) (Oxygen depleted) HPGT #5 relocated to Quest Airlock in EVA during STS-129
- FRAM-6 (keel side) Pump Module (PM SN0004). Originally held PM SN0005, launched on ELC-2. Healthy SN0005 and degraded SN0004 (on ESP-2) swapped robotically on 6 March 2015.
- FRAM-7 (keel side) NICER FRAM originally held an MBSU (delivered by the HTV-4 Exposed Pallet, and placed here by the SSRMS/SPDM Aug. 2013) removed by Expedition 32 crew and installed on truss degraded unit brought inside and returned to earth on the maiden flight of Dragon on SpX-C2.
- FRAM-8 (keel side) Mobile Transporter Trailing Umbilical System-Reel Assembly (MT TUS-RA #4) launched on ELC-2
- FRAM-9 (keel side) Nitrogen Tank Assembly (NTA SN0003) launched on ELC-2
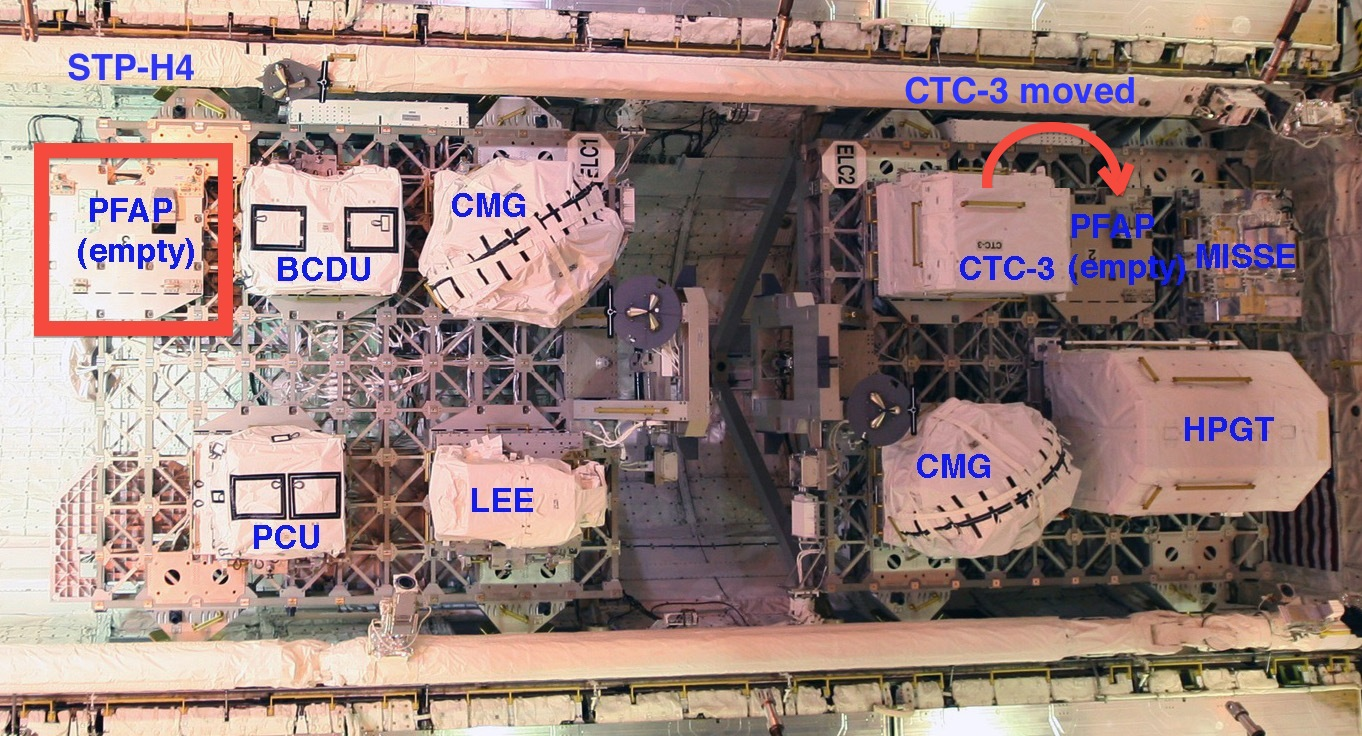
ELC-1 and ELC-2 (top side views) prelaunch, with red changes on orbit. Note MISSE-7/8 switch.

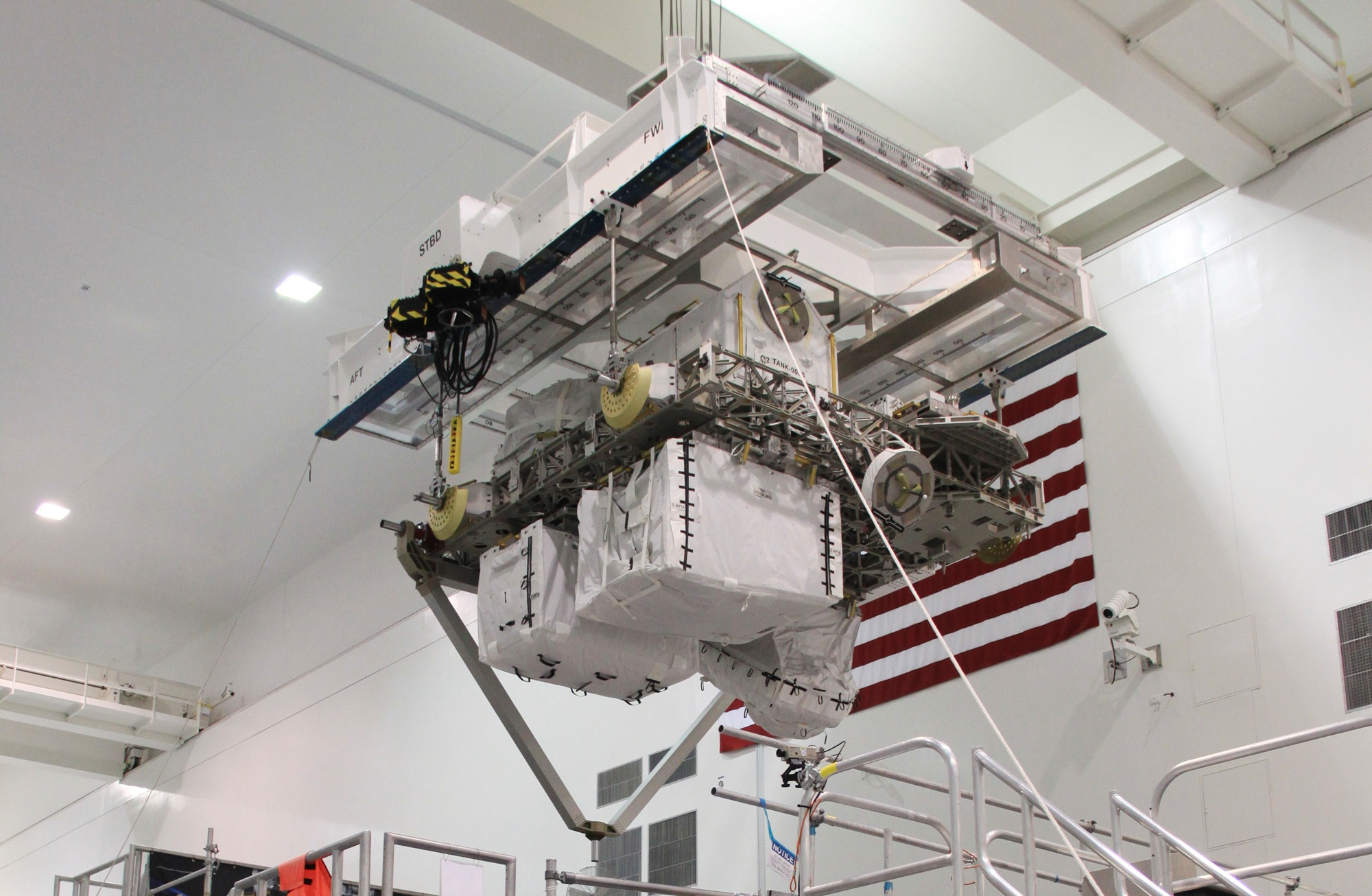
ELC-2 underside during its transfer into the payload canister in the SSPF

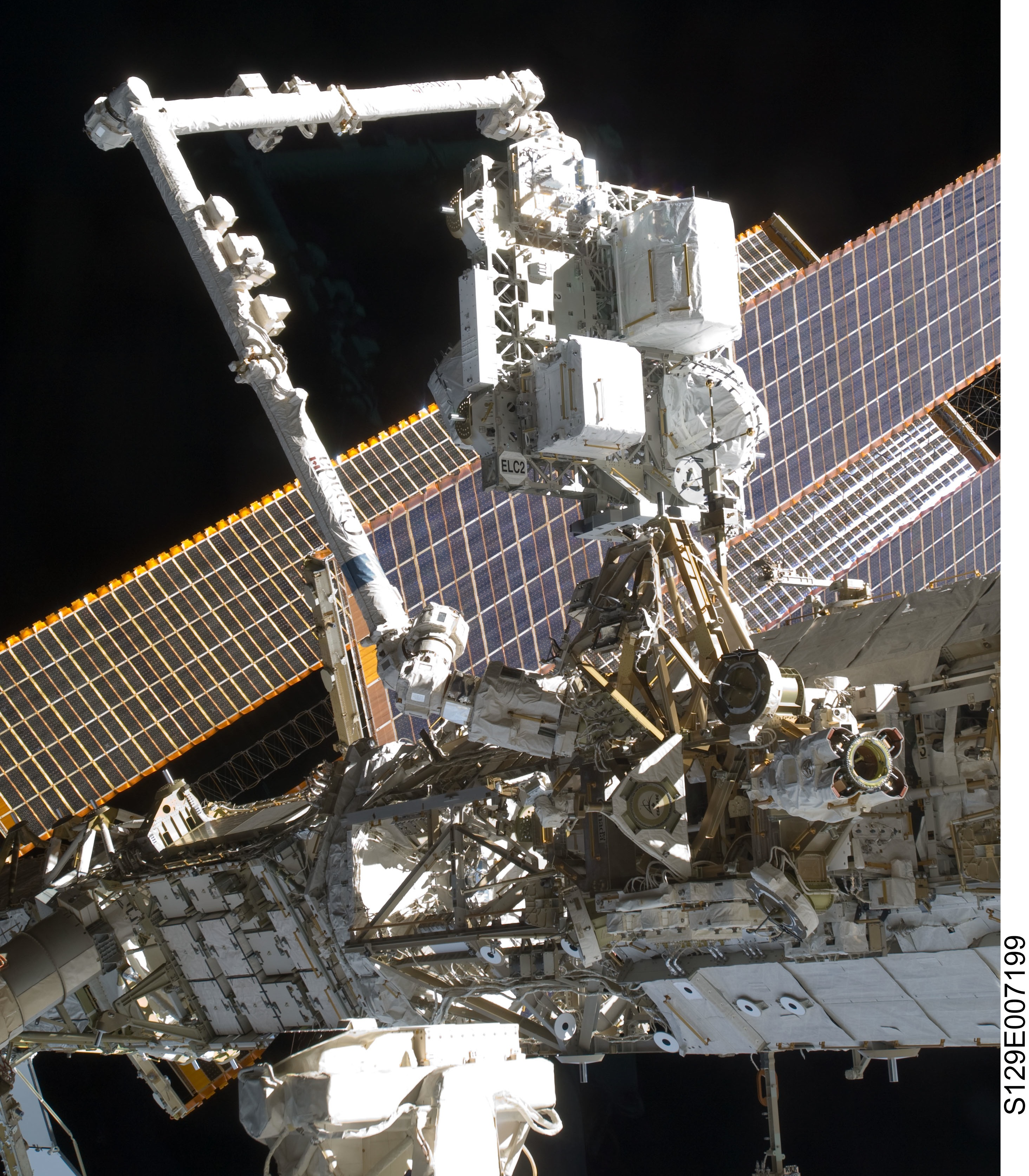
ELC-2 on the SSRMS prior to its placement on the S3 Truss

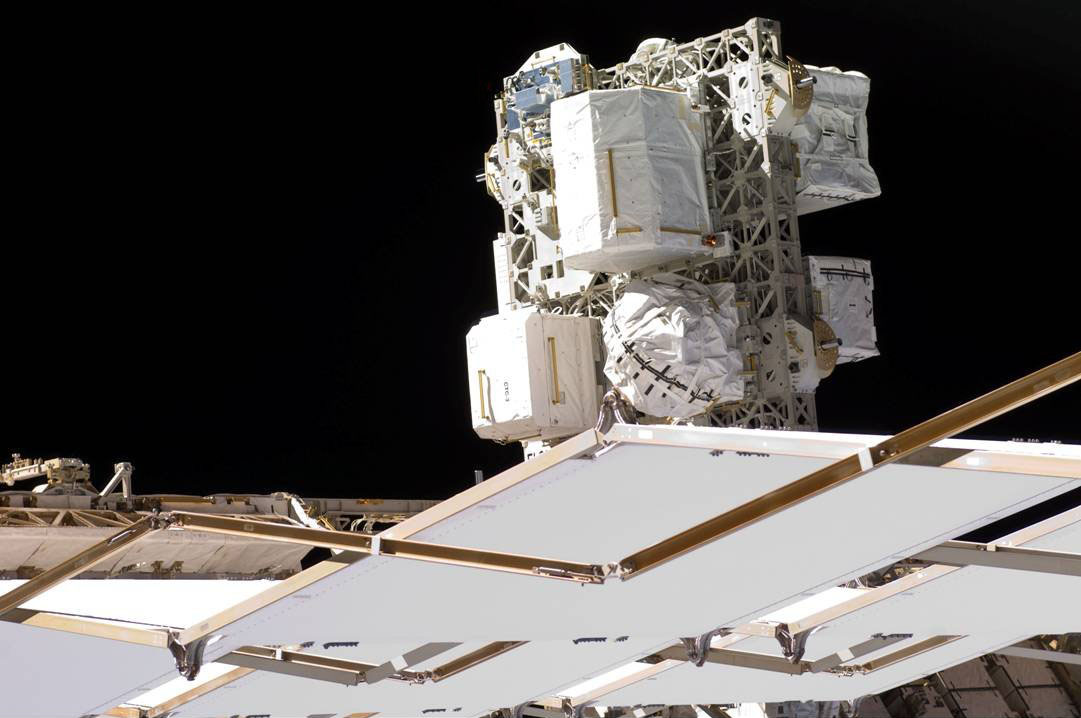
ELC-2 atop the S3 Truss

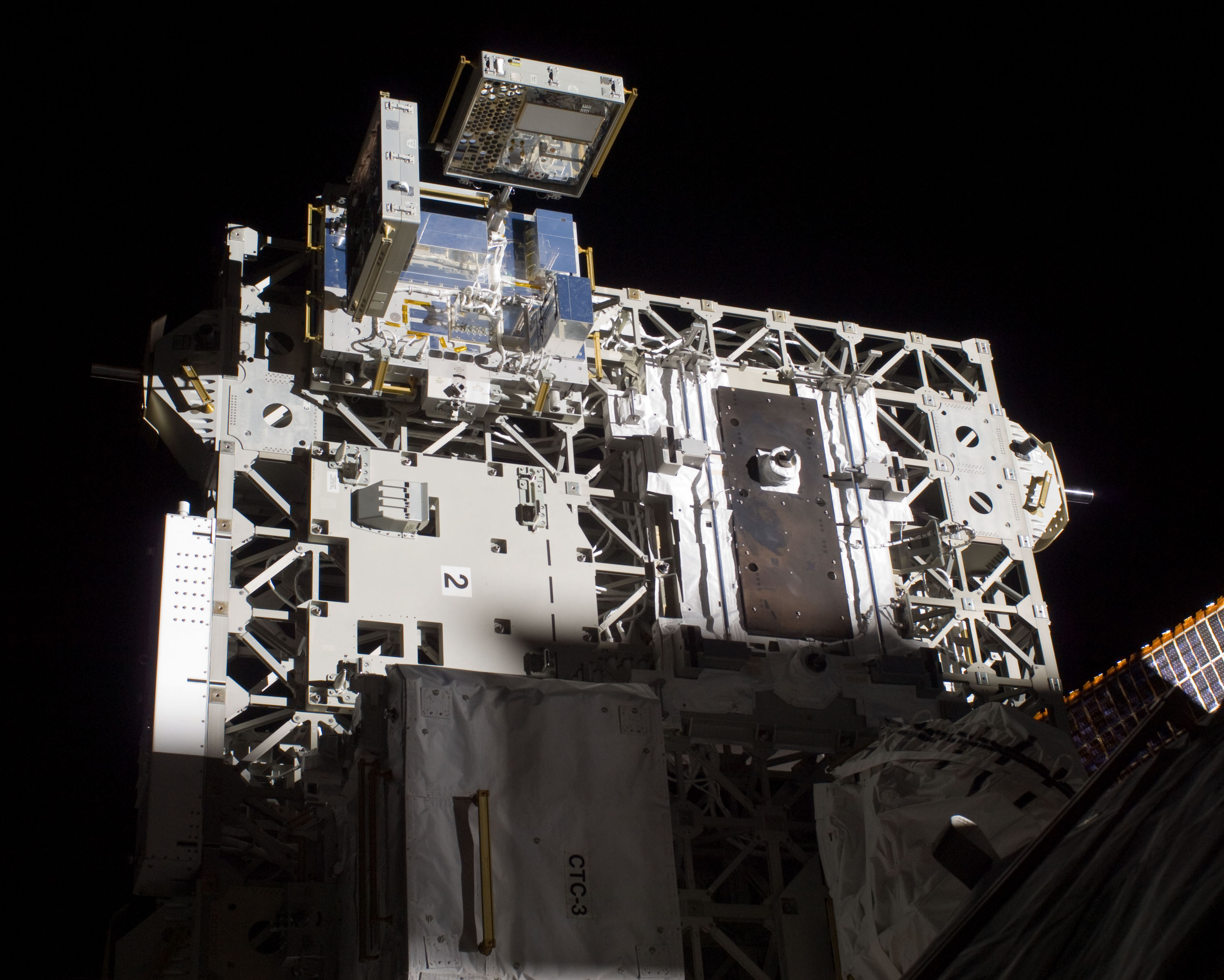
ELC-2 showing MISSE-7 and the vacated HPGT FRAM

=== ELC-3 ===
ExPRESS Logistics Carrier 3
Module statistics
- Part of: International Space Station
- Launch date: 16 May 2011, 12:56:28 UTC
- Launch vehicle: Space Shuttle/STS-134
- Berthed: 18 May 2011, 16:18 at S3 truss
- Mass: 6,361 kg (14,023 lb)

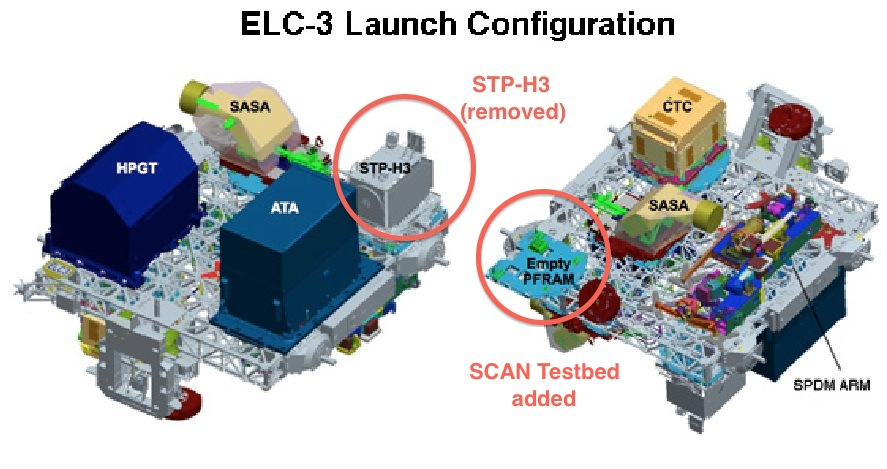
ELC-3 in its launch configuration, note STP-H3 removed, SCAN added

ELC-3 is located on the P3 truss at the UCCAS-1 (zenith, space facing) site. ELC-3 weighs 14,023 lbs.

- FRAM-1 (top side) Cargo Transport Container-5 (CTC-5) launched on ELC-3
- FRAM-2 (top side) Special Purpose Dextrous Manipulator (SPDM) Arm launched on ELC-3
- FRAM-3 (top side) CODEX (launched on SpaceX CRS-31) Formerly held SCAN Testbed, STP-H6, RRM3, and STP- H5 . (SCAN arrived in July 2012 via HTV-3. After 6 years serving as a test facility for NASA research on radio communications, SCAN was removed from the truss by SPDM/Dextre and loaded into the trunk of SpaceX CRS-17 for disposal.) (STP-H6 was installed in May 2019 on SpaceX CRS 17. Payload malfunctioned in September 2021 with XCOM deactivated by the DOD in October. Payload was removed by SPDM/Dextre November 2021 and disposed of on Cygnus NG-16. ) (RRM3 was installed in 2018 to replace RRM2. Payload malfunctioned in 2019 and its payload of methane and ammonia was vented into space. On October 26, 2023, it was installed on an external mounting point on the Cygnus NG-19 cargo spacecraft for disposal.) (STP-H5 was relocated from ELC 1 when AWE arrived. Payload malfunctioned in March 2024 and DOD declared end of mission. Payload was transferred to Cygnus NG- 20 and disposed of.)
- FRAM-4 (top side) Latching End Effector #5 (LEE #5) Formerly held S band Antenna Sub-System Assembly #3 (SASA) launched on ELC-3 relocated to ESP 2 to replace degraded SASA #1 which is still on ESP 2 after SASA #3 was installed on the truss in 2023 during a spacewalk.
- FRAM-5 (keel side) TSIS (launched with SDS on SpaceX CRS 13) FRAM formerly held Space Test Program-Houston 3 (STP-H3) DOD experiment launched on ELC-3 removed by the SPDM and placed on HTV-4 for disposal.
- FRAM-6 (keel side) Ammonia Tank Assembly (ATA) launched on ELC-3
- FRAM-7 (keel side) High Pressure Gas Tank (HPGT) launched on ELC-3
- FRAM-8 (keel side) S band Antenna Sub-System Assembly #4 (SASA #4) formerly held S band Antenna Sub-System Assembly #2 (SASA) launched on ELC-3
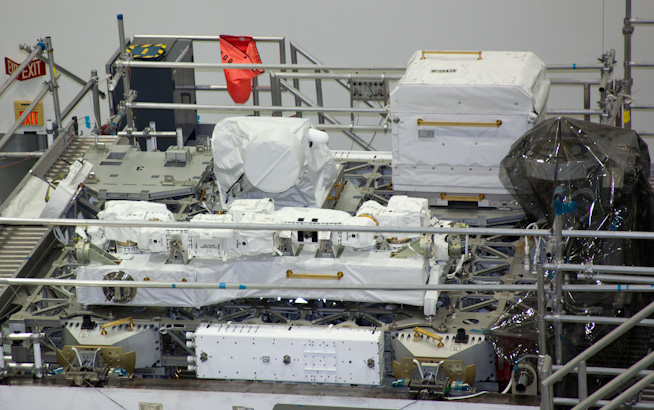
ELC-3 top view

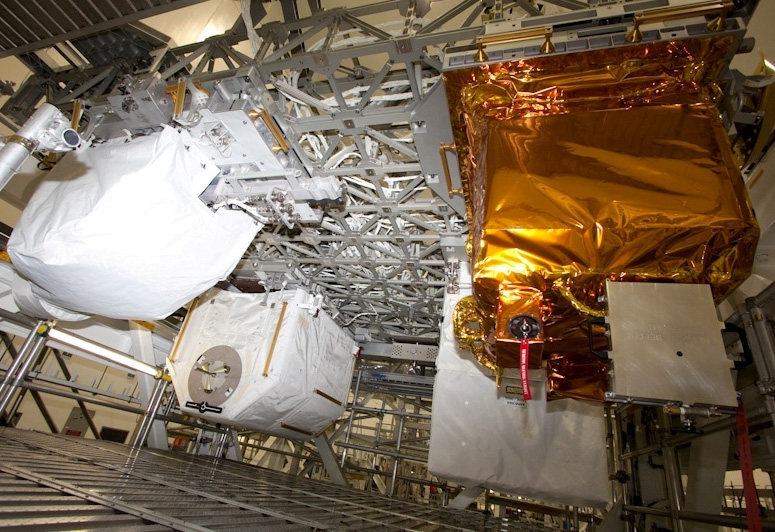
ELC-3 underside view

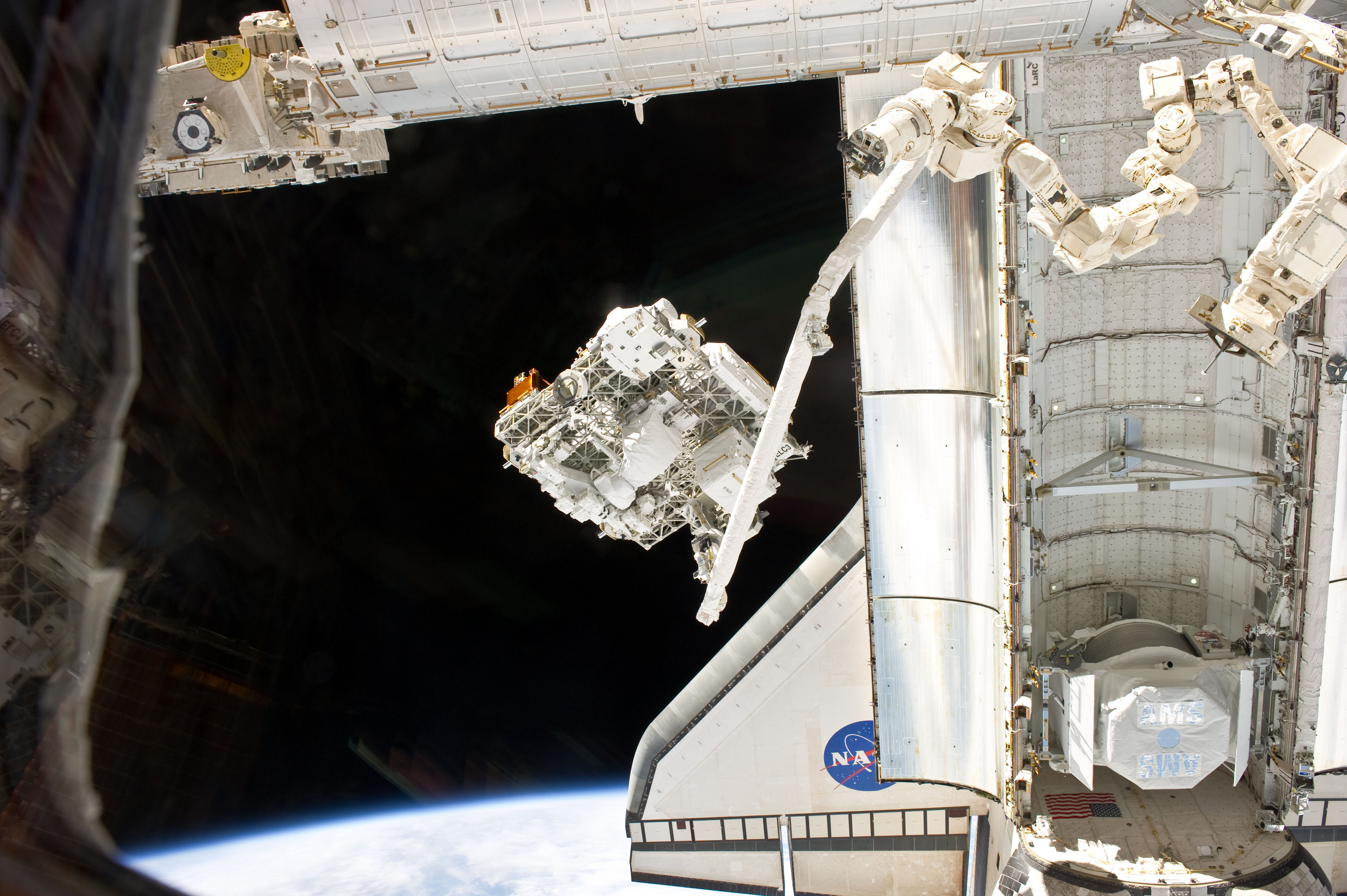
ELC-3 in the grasp of Endeavour's robotic arm

=== ELC-4 ===
ExPRESS Logistics Carrier 4
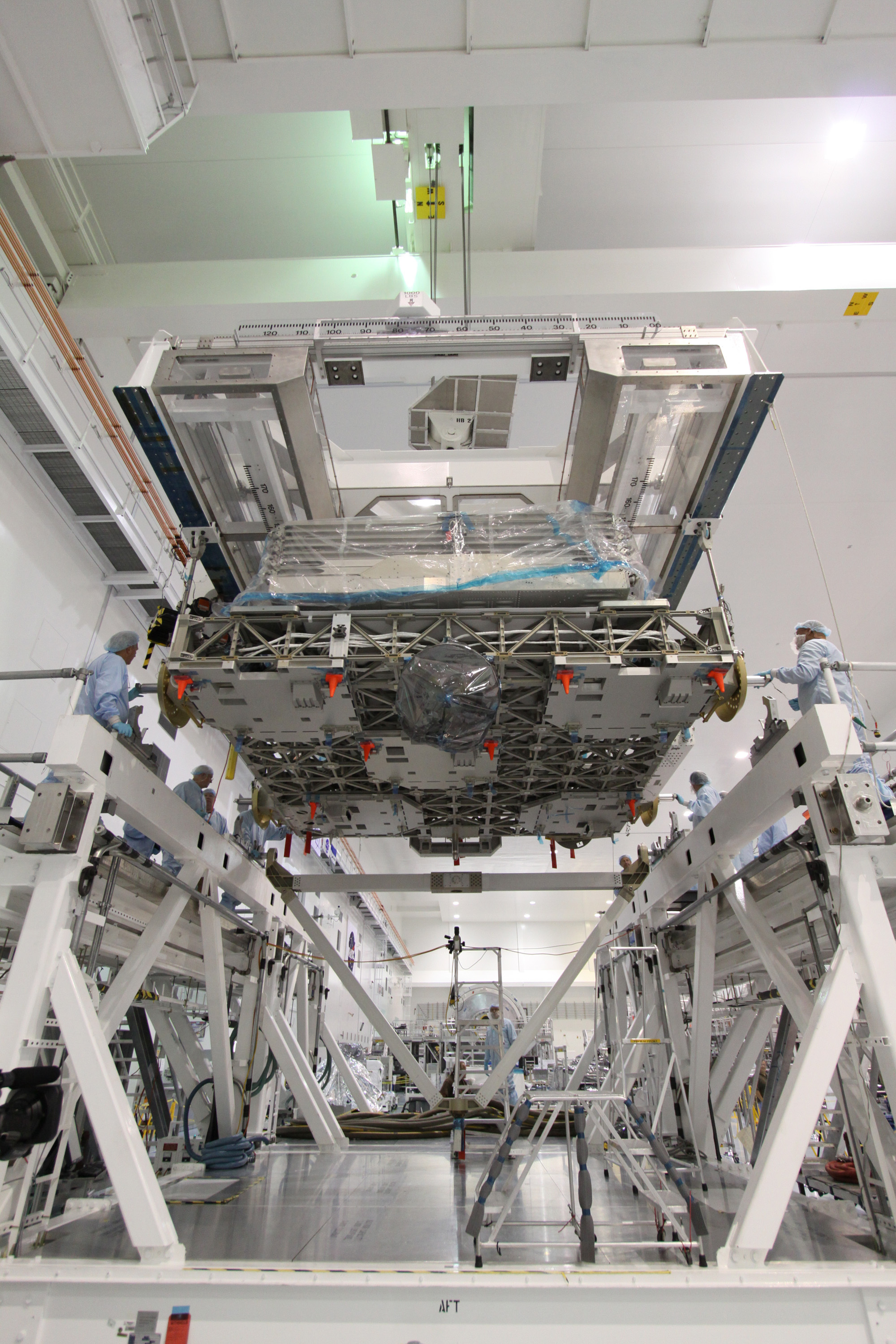
- In the Space Station Processing Facility at NASA's Kennedy Space Center in Florida, technicians perform the ELC-4, deck-to-keel mate.

Module statistics
- Part of: International Space Station
- Launch date: 24 February 2011, 21:53:24 UTC
- Launch vehicle: Space Shuttle/STS-133
- Berthed: 27 February 2011, 03:22 at S3 truss
- Mass: 3,735 kg (8,235 lb)

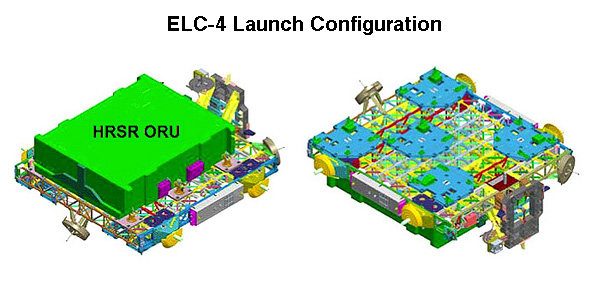
ELC-4 in its launch configuration

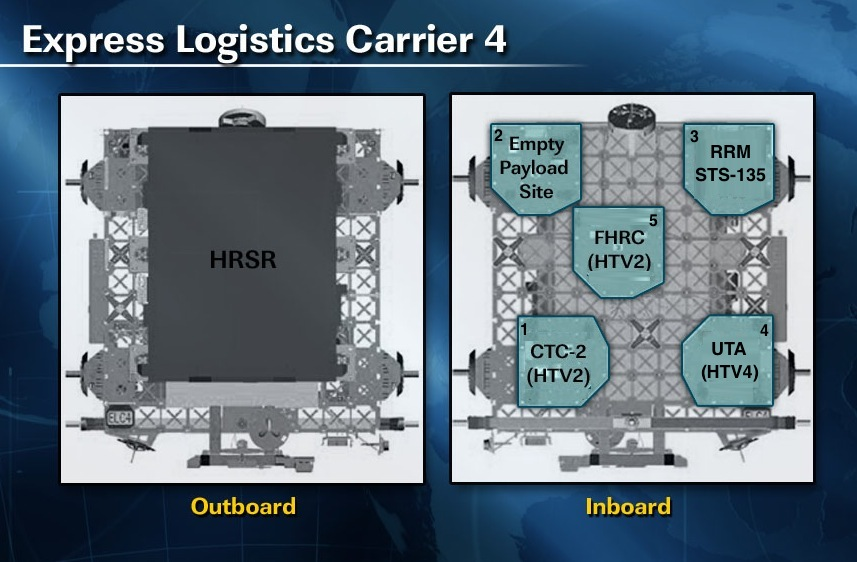
ELC-4 updated FRAM ORUs

ELC-4 is located on the S3 truss at the PAS-4 (nadir, earth facing) site, alongside ESP-3 at PAS-3. ELC-4 weighs 8,235 lbs.

- Heat Rejection System Radiator (HRSR) launched on the top side of ELC-4
- FRAM-1 (keel side) Cargo Transport Container-2 (CTC-2) delivered to ISS by HTV-2 (EP) via SPDM held by the SPDM since its initial delivery by the HTV-2
- FRAM-2 (keel side) MUSES delivered by SpaceX Dragon CRS-11
- FRAM-3 (keel side) SAGE III, formerly held Robotic Refueling Mission (RRM) was delivered to the ISS by STS-135, placing it temporarily on the SPDM at Destiny. (The RRM held by the SPDM was later moved to this FRAM. Removed by SPDM/Dextre on March 5, 2017 and stored in the trunk of SpaceX Dragon CRS10 for disposal.)
- FRAM-4 (keel side) Utility Transfer Assembly (delivered by HTV-4 EP via SPDM Aug. 2013)
- FRAM-5 (keel side) Flex Hose Rotary Coupler (FHRC SN1005) delivered to the ISS by HTV-2 Exposed Pallet (EP), was then moved to this FRAM via SPDM
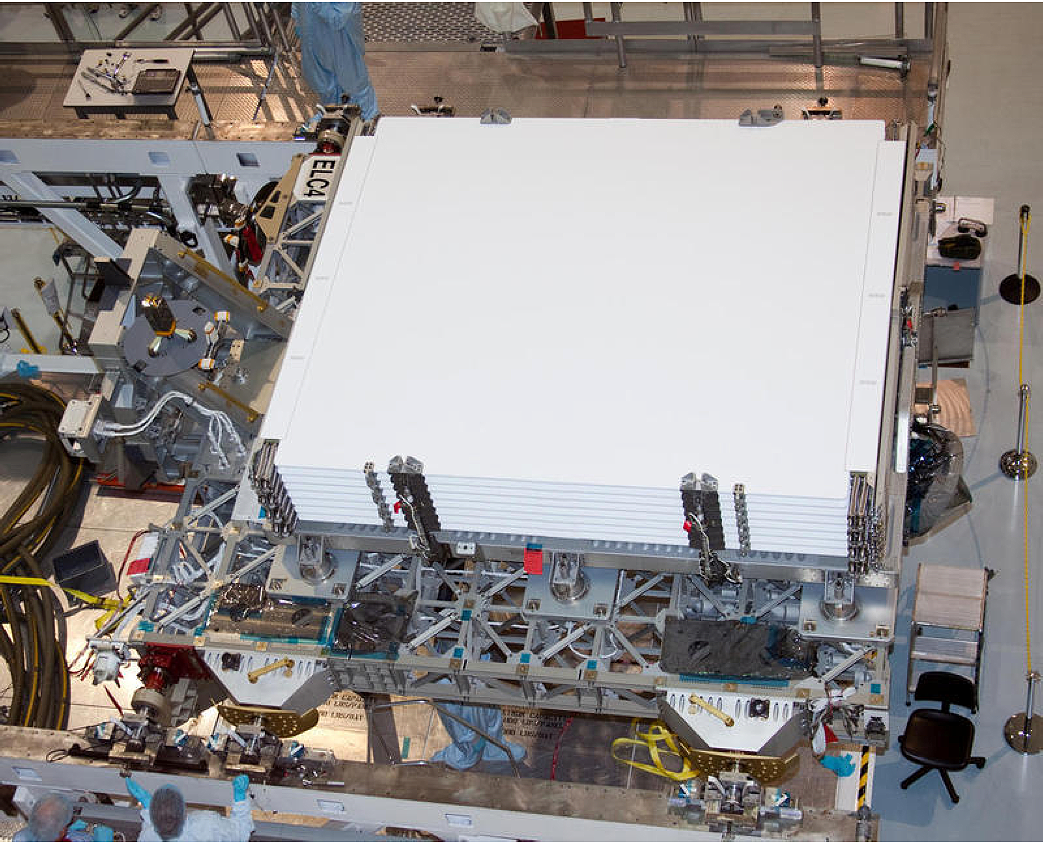
Heat rejection subsystem radiator (HRSR) on ELC-4

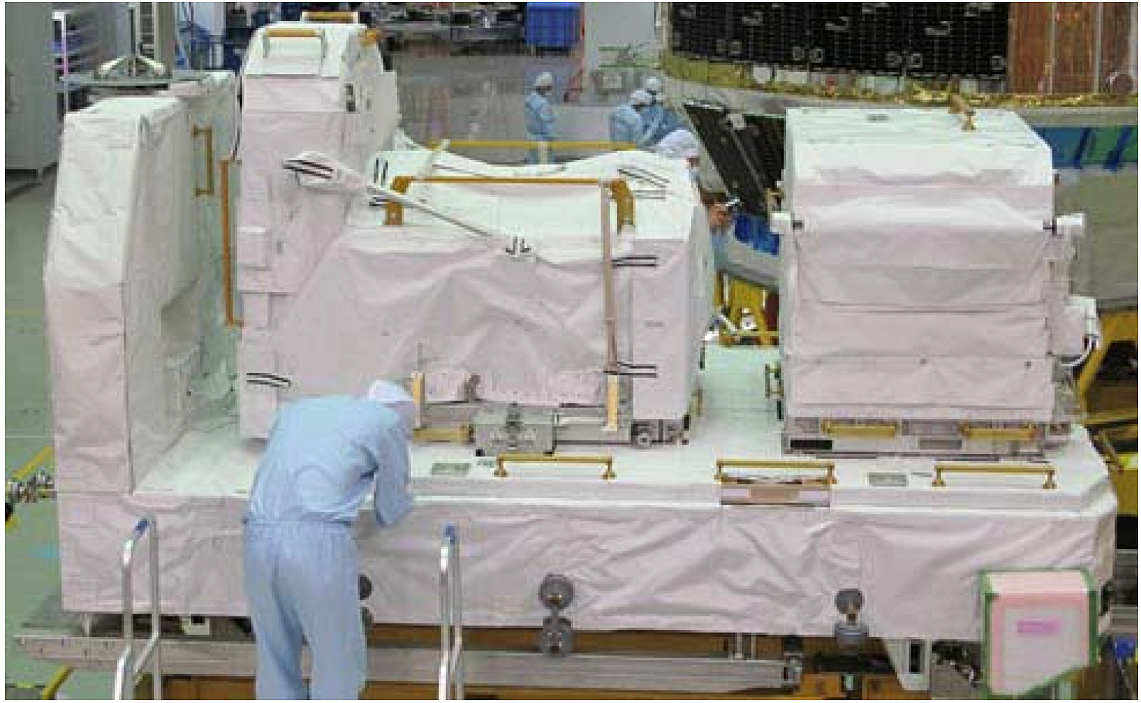
FHRC and CTC4 on the HTV-2 Exposed Platform

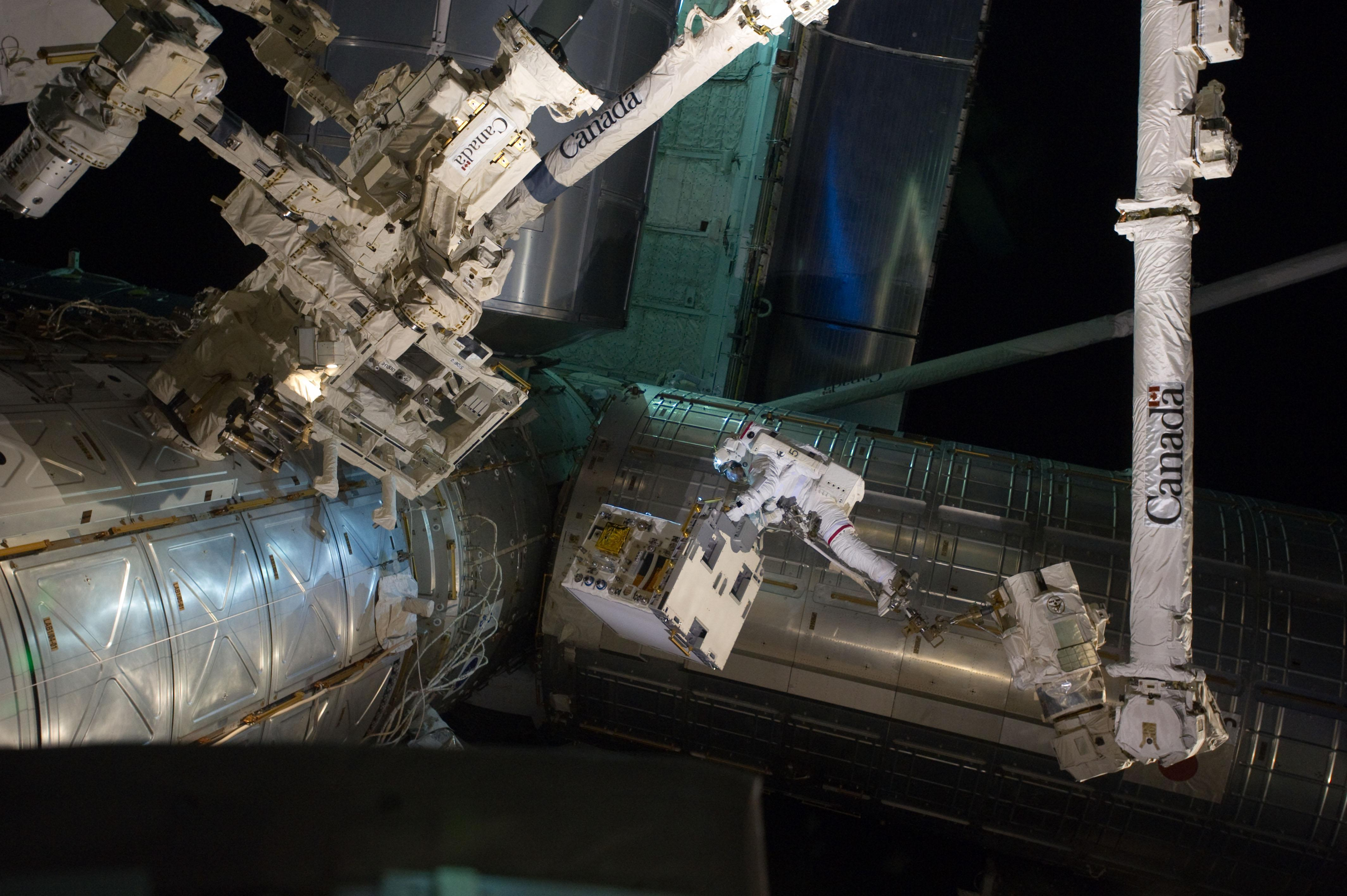
Mike Fossum rides on the ISS's robotic arm as he transfers the RRM to the SPDM for temporary storage

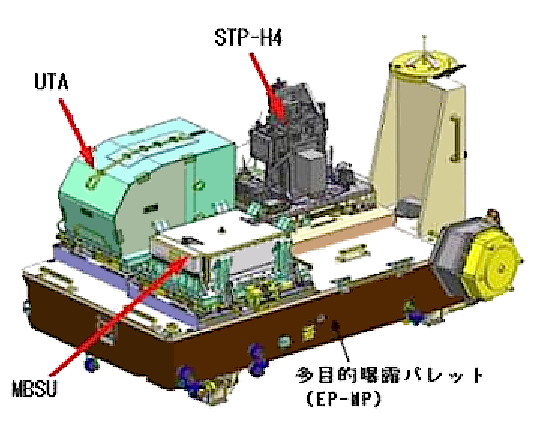
JEM Exposed Platform HTV-4

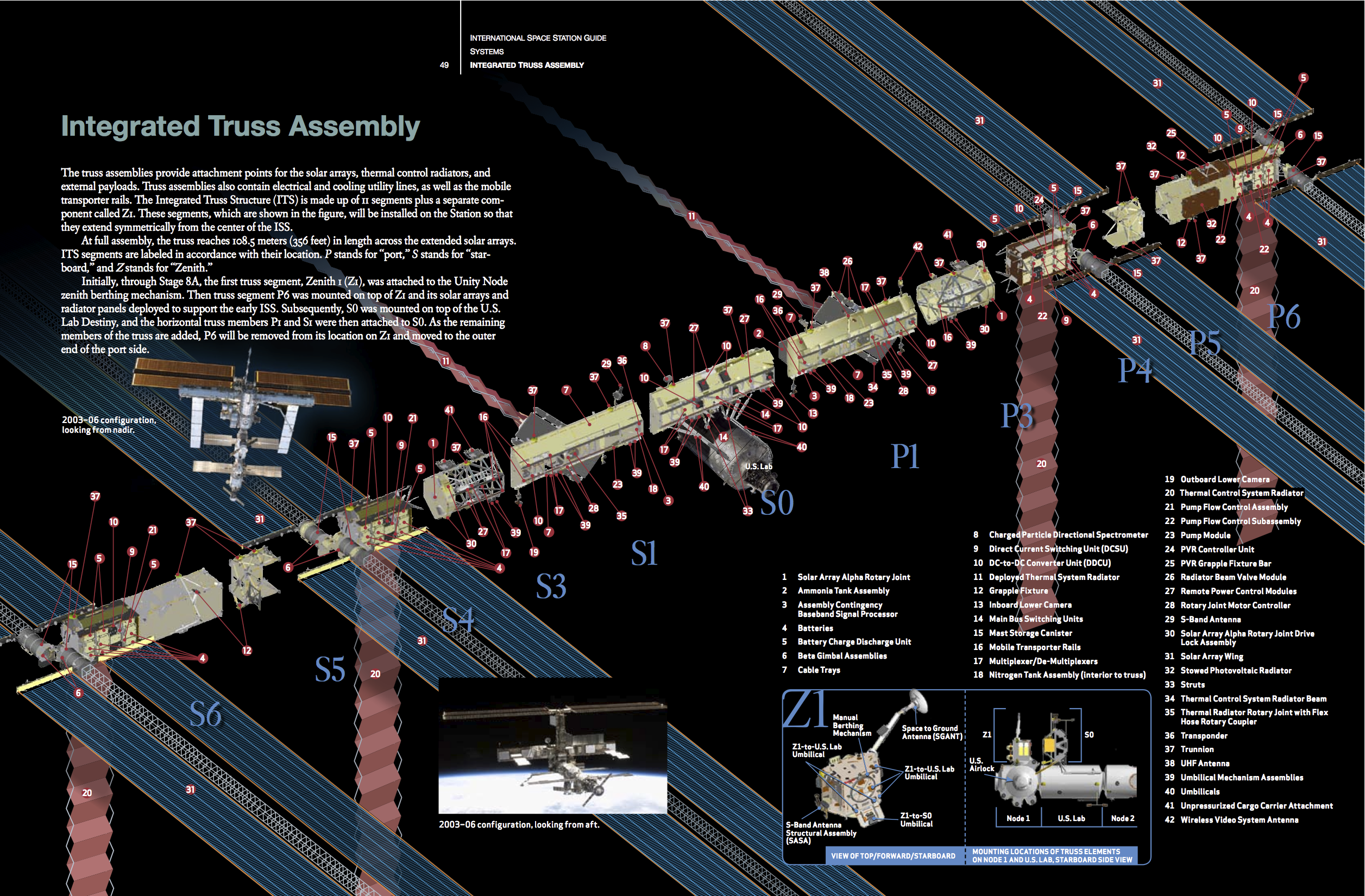
ISS truss components and ORUs in situ

== See also ==
- External Stowage Platform
- Integrated Cargo Carrier
- Scientific research on the ISS
- Orbital replacement unit
