= Atmospheric Waves Experiment =

NASA ISS instrument

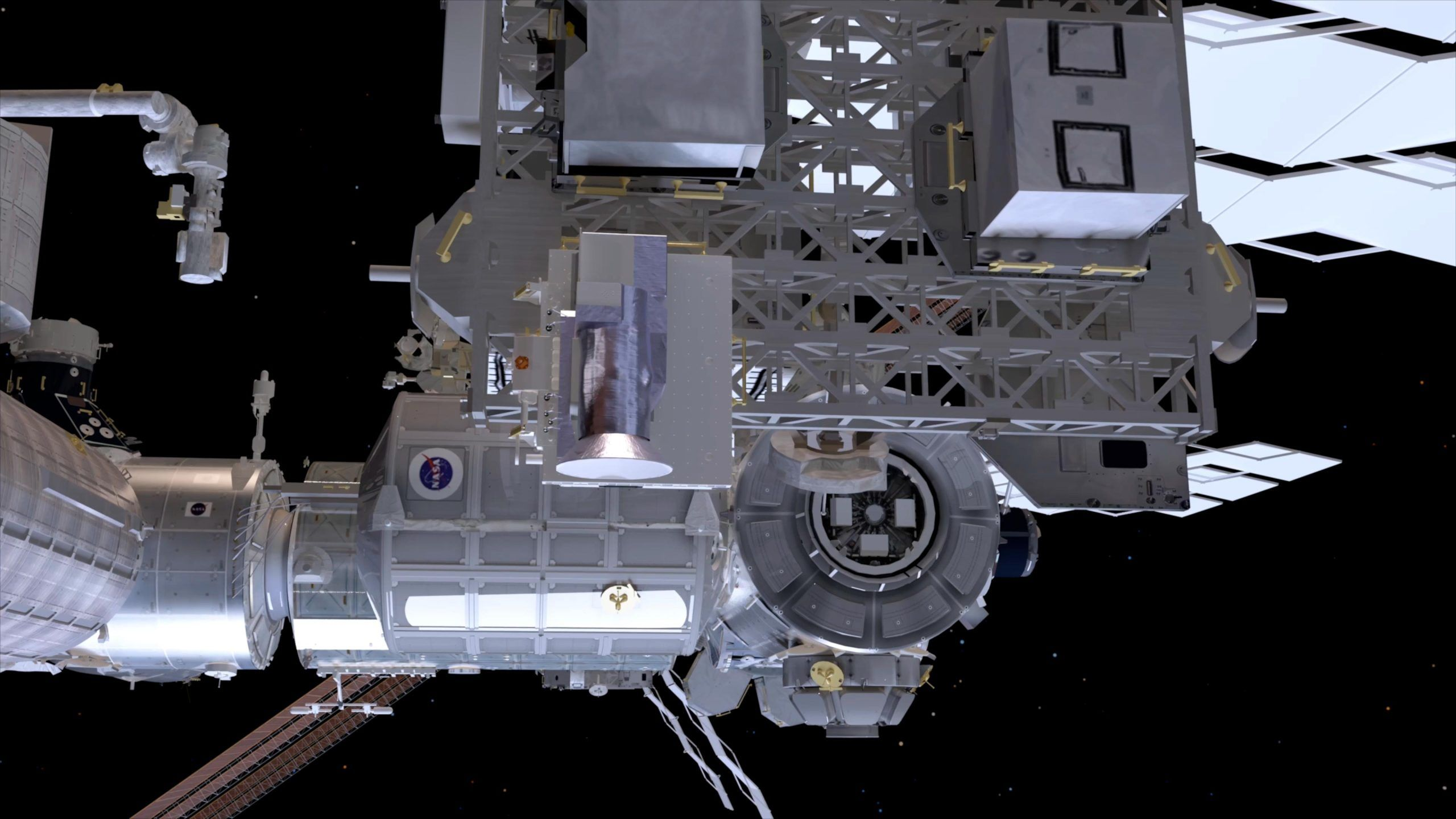
The instrument, seen here at photo center, was attached to the ISS in December of 2023.

The Atmospheric Waves Experiment (AWE) was a NASA Heliophysics instrument mounted on the exterior of the International Space Station (ISS) that investigated how terrestrial weather affects space weather via small-scale atmospheric gravity waves produced in Earth's atmosphere.

AWE was built by the Utah State University Space Dynamics Laboratory and led by Ludger Scherliess of Utah State University. NASA selected the instrument as a Heliophysics Explorers Program Mission of Opportunity in February 2019. The SpaceX CRS-29 spacecraft carrying AWE was successfully launched on 10 November 2023. Once at the ISS, AWE was extracted from the trunk section of the Cargo Dragon by the Dextre robotic arm and attached to the station's Express Payload Adapter (ExPA), ELC-1 Site 3.

AWE was turned off on 21 May 2026 after completing its mission. It will be removed from the station and jettisoned to space, where it will be disposed of by reentering Earth's atmosphere to burn up.

== Mission ==
In Earth's atmosphere, differences in air density cause atmospheric gravity waves (AGWs). These AGWS are notable for traveling upward through the atmosphere carrying energy, eventually reaching space where they are hypothesized to affect the plasma environment surrounding Earth or space weather. Space weather is known for causing interference in satellite and communication signals, including GPS navigation. Thus, an understanding of AGWs and how they interact with space weather may contribute to improving the forecast of radio interference.

When AGWs are in the realm of the atmosphere called the mesopause, they produce light, a phenomenon known as airglow. AWE observed this airglow in infrared, with its location at the ISS allowing global coverage.

== Instrument ==
AWE is NASA's first instrument dedicated to heliophysics on the ISS. The AWE mission's hardware was the Advanced Mesospheric Temperature Mapper (AMTM), which consisted of four identical radiometer telescopes assembly. Each telescope had an InGaAs detector array on its focal plane.

The instrument cost a total of $59 million for design and prime mission operations.
