= Wide Field Infrared Explorer =

NASA satellite of the Explorer program

Wide-field Infrared Explorer
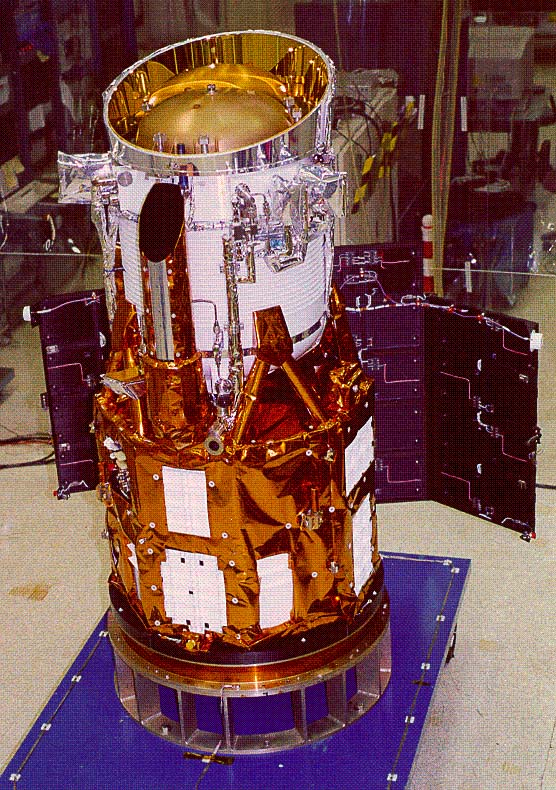
- Wide Field Infrared Explorer spacecraft
- Names: Explorer-75; WIRE; SMEX-5
- Mission type: Infrared astronomy
- Operator: NASA
- COSPAR ID: 1999-011A
- SATCAT no.: 25646
- Website: http://www.ipac.caltech.edu/wire/
- Mission duration: 4 months (planned); 1 year, 4 months, 10 days (achieved)

Spacecraft properties
- Spacecraft: Explorer LXXV
- Spacecraft type: Wide-field Infrared Explorer
- Bus: WIRE
- Manufacturer: Space Dynamics Laboratory (SDL)
- Launch mass: 250 kg (550 lb)
- Power: 160 watts

Start of mission
- Launch date: 5 March 1999, 02:56 UTC
- Rocket: Pegasus XL (F26)
- Launch site: Vandenberg Air Force Base, Stargazer
- Contractor: Orbital Sciences Corporation
- Entered service: Failed on orbit

End of mission
- Deactivated: 30 September 2000
- Last contact: 23 October 2006
- Decay date: 10 May 2011, 07:00 UTC

Orbital parameters
- Reference system: Geocentric orbit
- Regime: Sun-synchronous orbit
- Perigee altitude: 470 km (290 mi)
- Apogee altitude: 540 km (340 mi)
- Inclination: 97°

Wide-field Infrared Explorer (WIRE, also Explorer 75 and SMEX-5) was a NASA satellite launched on 5 March 1999, on the Pegasus XL launch vehicle into polar orbit between 409 and 426 km (254 and 265 mi) above the surface of Earth. WIRE was intended to be a four-month infrared survey of the entire sky at 21-27 μm and 9-15 μm, specifically focusing on starburst galaxies and luminous protogalaxies.

WIRE had problems and was unable to carry out its IR survey, and was deactivated on 30 September 2000, and finally reentered and burned up in 2011.

== Science ==
The science team was based at the Infrared Processing and Analysis Center (IPAC) in Pasadena, California. Flight operations, integration, and testing were from Goddard Space Flight Center in Maryland. The telescope was built by Space Dynamics Laboratory in Utah. Premature ejection of the spacecraft aperture cover led to depletion of the solid hydrogen shortly after launch, ending the primary science mission. The onboard star tracker remained functional and was used for long-term precision photometric monitoring of bright stars in support of an asteroseismology program. WIRE reentered atmosphere of Earth on 10 May 2011 (around 07:00 UTC).

The Wide-field Infrared Explorer (WIRE) was a two-color, solid hydrogen-cooled, infrared imaging telescope designed to study starburst galaxies and to search for protogalaxies. The science goals of WIRE were to: 1) determine what fraction of the luminosity of the universe at a redshift of >0.5 is due to starburst galaxies; 2) assess how fast and in what ways starburst galaxies evolve; and, 3) examine whether luminous protogalaxies are common at redshifts <3. In order to accomplish these goals, WIRE was to conduct a four-month survey at 12- and 25-μm over an area of between ten and several hundred square degrees of the sky.

=== WIRE telescope ===
The WIRE telescope itself had an entrance aperture of 30 cm (12 in) and a 32 x 32 arcminutes field of view (FoV). It was of a Ritchey–Chrétien telescope design with no moving parts and no reimaging optics.

Shortly after launch, while the spacecraft was still tumbling early after orbit insertion, the telescope cover came off prematurely. This resulted in the exposure of the cryogenic materials to light, warming them at a high rate causing outgassing and increasing the rate of spin of the spacecraft beyond the ability of the reaction wheels to slow it. Although ground controllers began work to decrease the excess spin of the spacecraft, they were not able to do so in time to prevent the total loss of the frozen hydrogen used to cool the primary science instrument. Attempts to recover control of the spacecraft were successful, though as a result of the coolant loss no science data were obtainable.

== Mission ==
A design flaw in the spacecraft control electronics caused the telescope dust cover to eject prematurely in its first few hours on orbit, exposing the telescope to the Earth. In normal operations, the telescope would avoid pointing at the Earth as well as the Sun because the heat load was too high for the cryogenic cooling. At this early stage in the mission, the telescope was deliberately pointed at the Earth for safety under the assumption that the dust cover was present. The influx of power into the telescope caused the solid hydrogen cryostat to boil off all of its cryogen. The cryostat was designed to non-propulsively vent small amounts of gaseous hydrogen as the instruments were cooled. However, due to the unexpected heating, the vent began expelling gas at rates orders of magnitude higher than designed. The over-active vent acted as an uncontrolled, off-axis thruster. Eventually, the attitude control system was unable to counter the thrust of the cryostat vent, and the spacecraft began to spin. By the time the hydrogen supply was exhausted, the spacecraft was spinning as fast as 60 rpm. As the thrust finally abated, spacecraft engineers were able to re-establish attitude control. However, with the cryogen gone, the science instrument was no longer functional and the original science mission ended.

In order to salvage some functionality from the US$73 million spacecraft, operations were redirected after the failure of the cryogenic system to an alternate science mission using the undamaged onboard star tracker for long-term monitoring of bright stars in support of an asteroseismology program. This redirection of mission was proposed by Derek Buzasi, who was not affiliated with the WIRE team, but whose research interests included asteroseismology and detector design, and who was at the time an Assistant Research Scientist on the Cosmic Origins Spectrograph project at the Space Sciences Laboratory at the University of California, Berkeley. The technique of asteroseismology aims to measure very low-amplitude oscillations in nearby stars to probe their structure. While the star tracker had poor spatial resolution, having been designed primarily for a wide field of view and detection of the brightest stars, it was above the atmosphere and thus avoided scintillation, enabling high-precision photometry. As a secondary experiment, one solar array also included a section with reflectors, to test a concentrator system. The WIRE asteroseismology mission was deactivated on 30 September 2000, reactivated through Bowie State University's Satellite Operations and Control Center from 2003 through 2006, then communications were finally lost on 23 October 2006. WIRE re-entered Earth's atmosphere on 10 May 2011.

The original science goals of WIRE may finally be achieved by the Wide-field Infrared Survey Explorer (WISE) (Explorer 92) mission which was successfully launched into orbit on 14 December 2009 and began observations on 14 January 2010.

== See also ==
- IRAS – Infrared space observatory
- WISE – NASA satellite of the Explorer program
- Spitzer Space Telescope – NASA infrared space telescope (2003–2020)
- JWST – NASA/ESA/CSA space infrared telescope launched in 2021
- Nancy Grace Roman Space Telescope Infrared space telescope
