= Space Dynamics Laboratory =

Nonprofit government contractor owned by Utah State University

Coordinates: 41°45′47″N 111°49′19″W

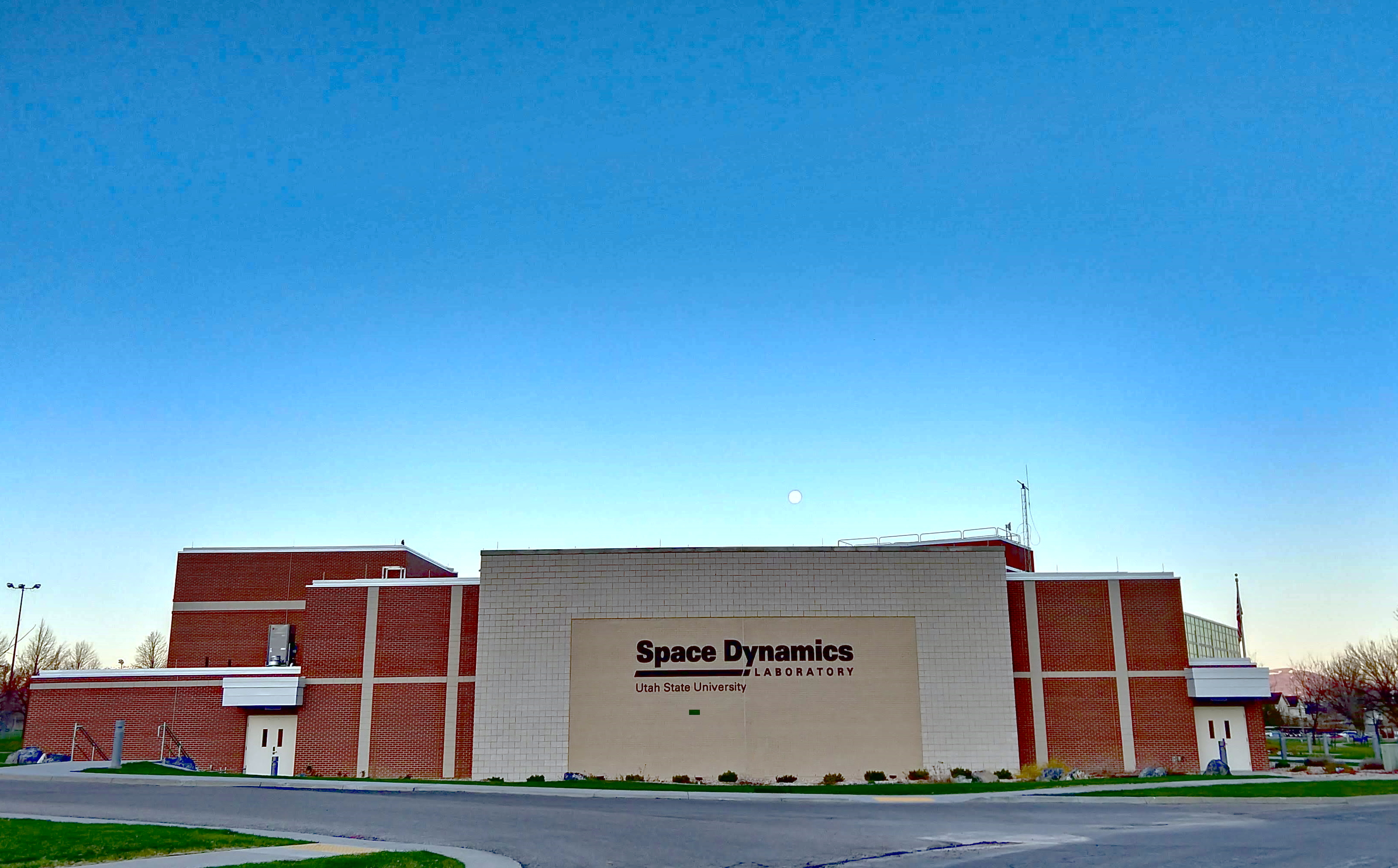
- Looking west at the Space Dynamics Laboratory auditorium building in the morning
- Abbreviation: SDL
- Predecessor: Electro-Dynamics Laboratories (EDL), Upper Air Research Laboratory (UARL)
- Founded: 1982; 44 years ago
- Type: Nonprofit
- Headquarters: North Logan, Utah, United States
- President: Jed J Hancock
- Parent organization: Utah State University
- Affiliations: UARC for the Missile Defense Agency
- Revenue: About US$175 million (FY2019)
- Staff: 900+ (FY2019)
- Website: www.sdl.usu.edu

Space Dynamics Laboratory (SDL) is a nonprofit government contractor owned by Utah State University. SDL is the sole University Affiliated Research Center (UARC) for the United States Missile Defense Agency and the United States Space Force; and, is one of 15 UARCs in the nation for the United States Department of Defense. Together with Utah State University, SDL has completed over 420 successful space missions and deployed over 500 independent hardware and software systems into space.

SDL was formed in 1982 from the merger of Utah State University's Electro Dynamics Laboratories (founded in 1959) and the University of Utah's Upper Air Research Laboratory (founded in 1948). The corporation has been responsible for the design, fabrication, and operation of sensors on over 430 payloads ranging from aircraft and rocket-borne experiments to space shuttle experiments and satellite-based sensor systems. SDL provides sensor systems and supporting technologies to address challenges for the United States government. SDL designs and develops electro-optical sensors, builds small satellites, provides calibration services, and creates real-time data reconnaissance systems.

SDL employs over 900 engineers, students, and professional staff at facilities in Logan, Utah; Albuquerque, New Mexico; Bedford, Massachusetts; Dayton, Ohio; Huntsville, Alabama; Houston, Texas; Los Angeles, California; and Washington, D.C.

== History ==
SDL origins date back to 1948 with experiments by the University of Utah Upper Air Research Laboratory (UARL) to measure electron density in the upper atmosphere of Earth utilizing German V-2 rockets. In 1959, the Electro-Dynamics Laboratories (EDL) was founded at Utah State University. The UARL relocated to Utah State University in 1970 and merged with EDL in 1982 to form SDL. One of the early missions involved measurements during Operation Dominic in 1962. In 1965, the laboratory participated in its 100th launch aboard a sounding rocket. In 1982, SDL participated in its first experiment (the Vehicle Charging and Potential experiment) aboard a space shuttle as part of STS-3.

== Projects for NASA ==
SDL has been a contractor for NASA on a variety of missions for decades.

In 2019, NASA selected USU to conduct the Atmospheric Waves Experiment (AWE) led by Mike Taylor. AWE involves an imager built at SDL that will be mounted on the International Space Station (ISS) to map airglow.

Other NASA projects include:

- Thermal links for infrared instruments on the James Webb Space Telescope.
- SDL built and tested the Wide-field Infrared Survey Explorer (WISE) science instrument, which was used to discover thousands of minor planets and numerous star clusters. Its solid hydrogen coolant was depleted in February 2011 and then in 2013, WISE was given a second mission, with the title Near-Earth Object Wide-field Infrared Survey Explorer (NEOWISE) to search for comets and asteroids that might impact the earth, including Comet NEOWISE.
- SDL designed, manufactured, and tested the cryogenic subsystems for the focal plane assemblies of Orbiting Carbon Observatory (OCO) and of OCO-2.
- Solar occultation for ice experiment (SOFIE) on board the Aeronomy of Ice in the Mesosphere (AIM) satellite was designed and fabricated at SDL.
- The Floating Potential Measurement Unit (FPMU) designed and built by SDL monitors surface charging of the International Space Station (ISS).
- The detector electronics assemblies for the OSIRIS-REx Camera Suite (OCAMS) to image the asteroid, search for outgassing plumes, and document the sample acquisition.
- Cryogenic Infrared Radiance Instrumentation for Shuttle (CIRRIS 1A) flew onboard Space Shuttle Discovery in 1991 as part of STS-39. CIRRIS was used to measure phenomena such as airglow and auroral phenomenology. SDL designed, built, and tested the instrument.
- A subsystem for the Plankton, Aerosol, Cloud, ocean Ecosystem (PACE) satellite was built at SDL.
- WIRE was a space telescope built and tested at SDL, part of an $80 million mission. The telescope failed soon after launch and SDL representatives accepted responsibility for the failure.
