= Integrated Truss Structure =

Part of the International Space Station; sequence of connected trusses

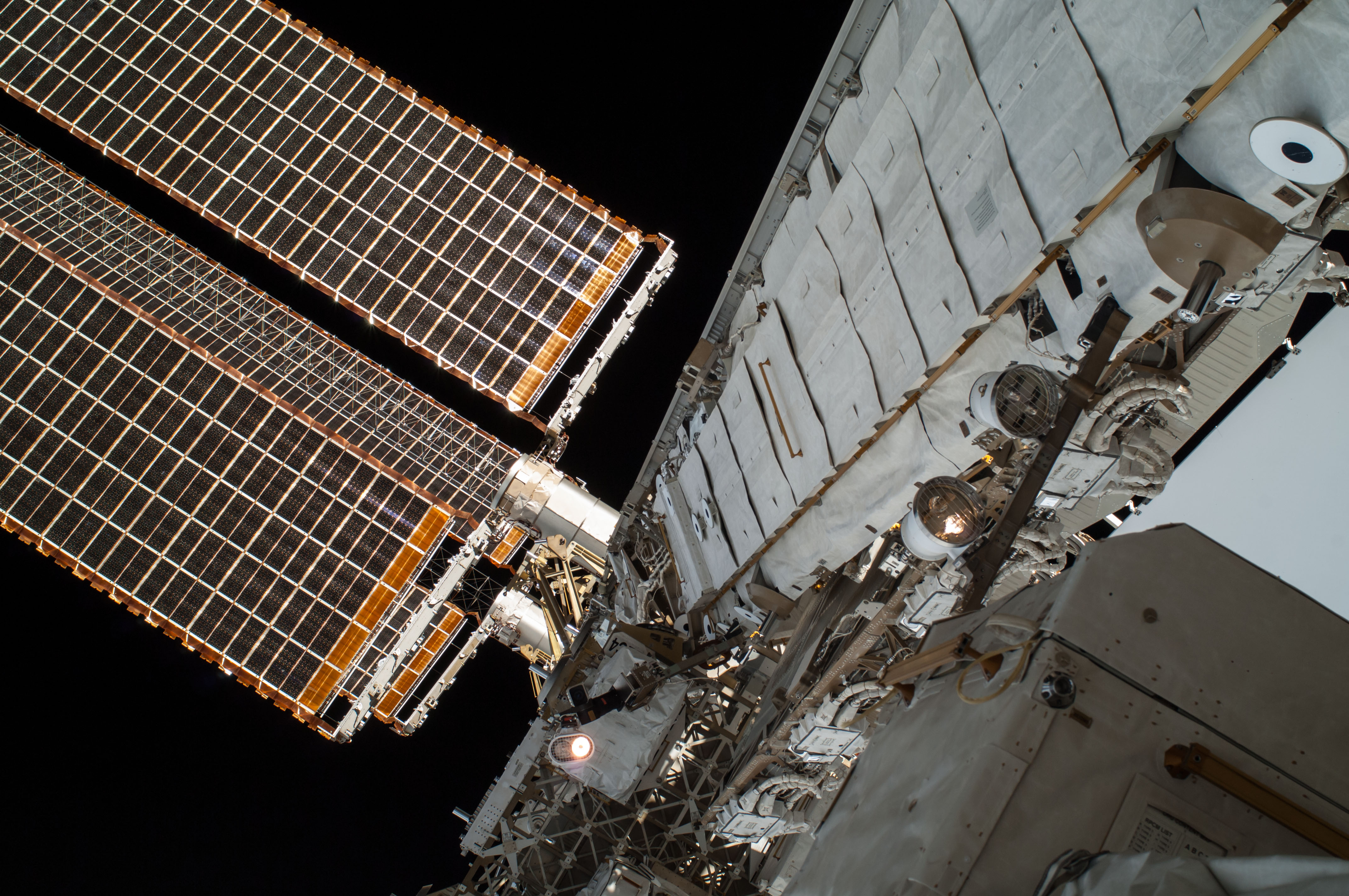
EVA view of the ISS solar arrays and steel truss structure. The white cladding are Kevlar panels to protect from micro-meteoroids

ISS elements as of December 2022 in exploded view.

The Integrated Truss Structure (ITS) of the International Space Station (ISS) consists of a linear arranged sequence of connected trusses on which various unpressurized components are mounted such as logistics carriers, radiators, solar arrays, and other equipment. It supplies the ISS with a bus architecture. It is approximately 110 metres (360 feet) long, weighs slightly under 118 tonnes (260,000 lb) with all its attached equipment, and is made primarily from aluminium and stainless steel.

== Truss components ==
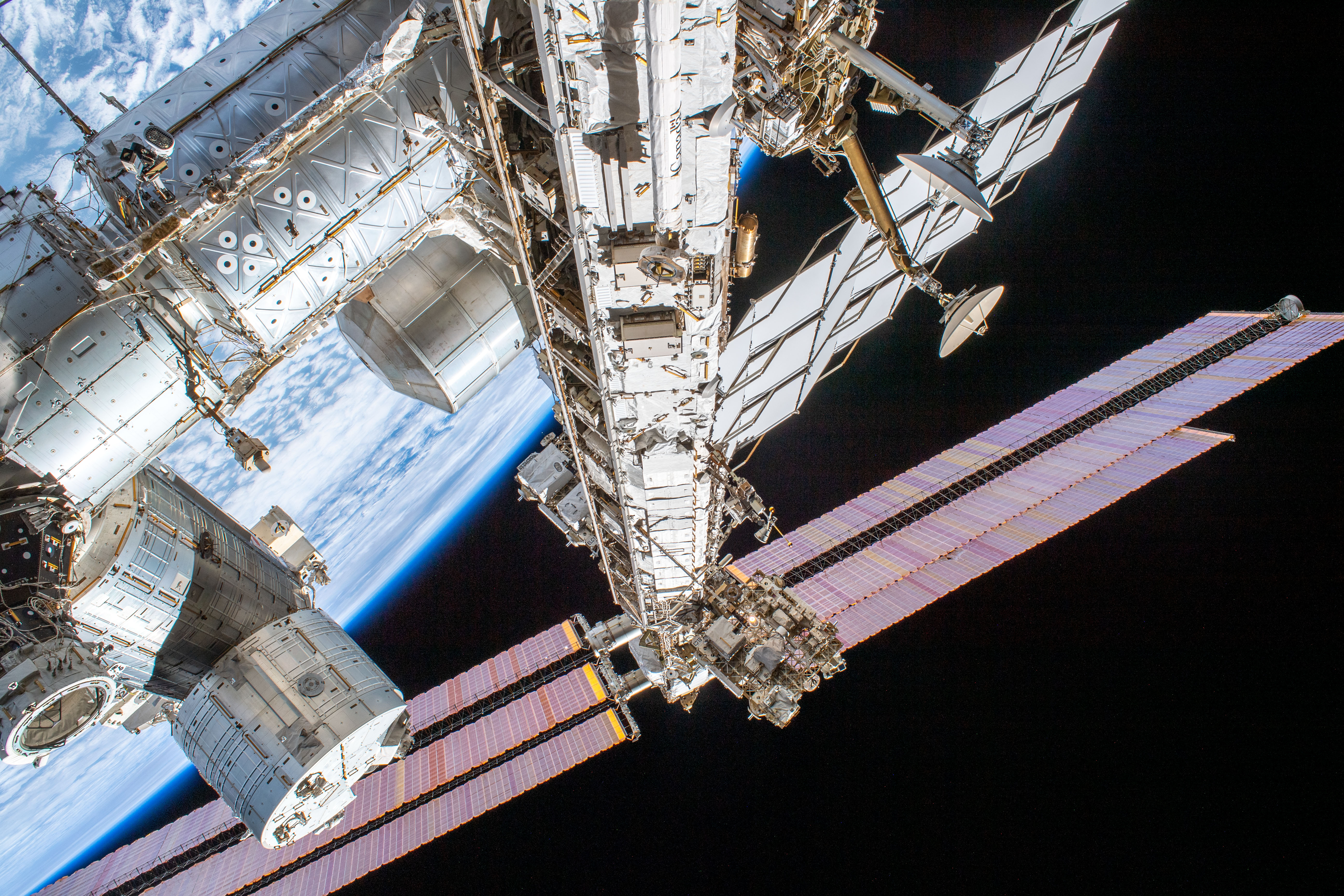
High elevation view of the truss steelwork, port-side radiators and solar arrays, in 2019

All truss components were named after their planned end-positions: Z for zenith, S for starboard and P for port, with the number indicating the sequential position. The S0 truss might be considered a misnomer, as it is mounted centrally on the zenith position of Destiny and is neither starboard nor port side.

=== Manufacturing ===
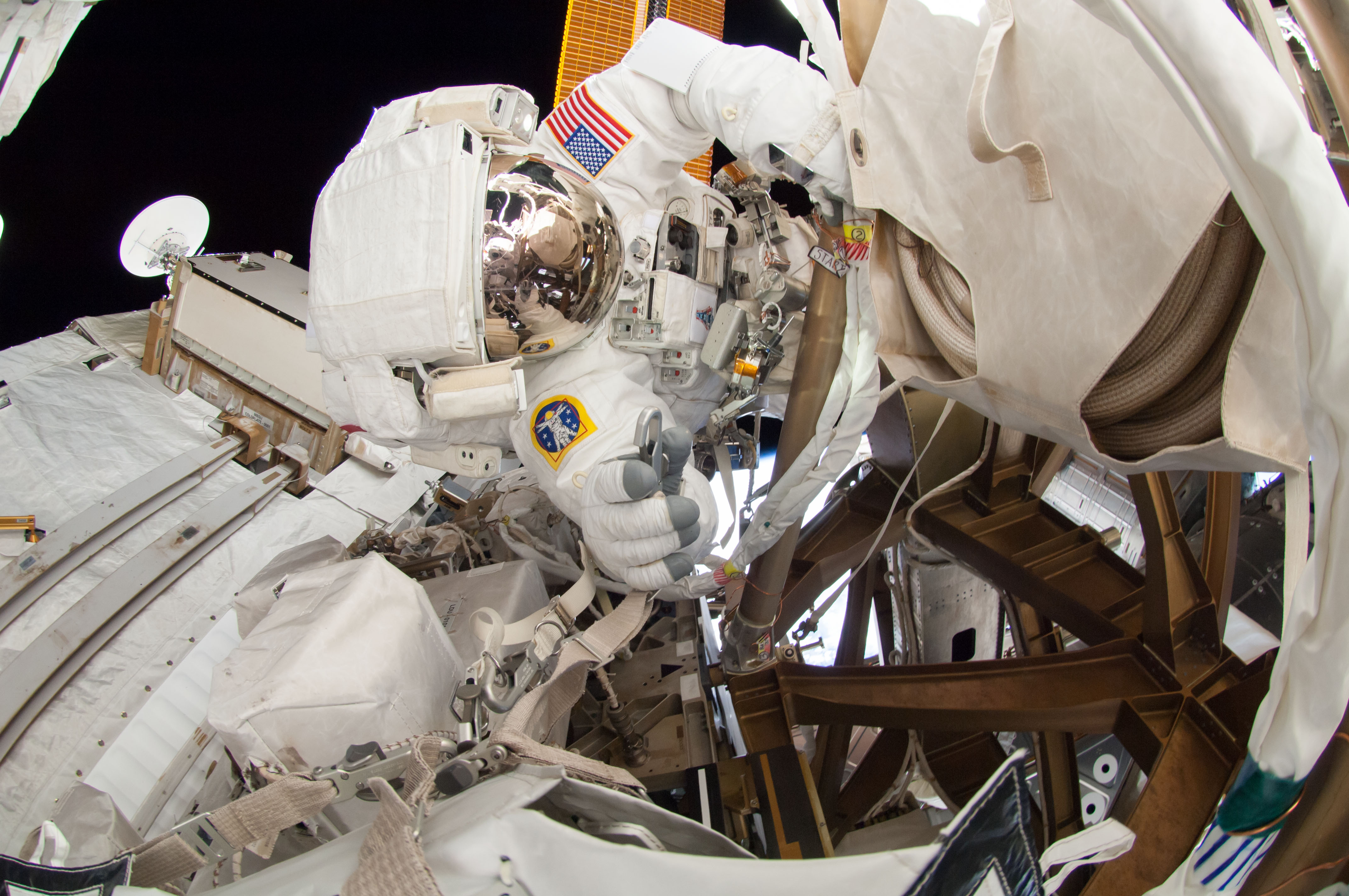
NASA Astronaut Reid Wiseman inspects the steel framework of the truss structure

ISS truss segments were fabricated by Boeing in its facilities at Huntington Beach, California (formerly McDonnell Douglas), Michoud Assembly Facility in New Orleans, Louisiana, Marshall Space Flight Center in Huntsville, Alabama, and in Tulsa, Oklahoma. The trusses were then transported or shipped to Kennedy Space Center's Space Station Processing Facility for final assembly and checkout.

The structural framework was made using several manufacturing processes, including the investment casting, steel hot rolling, friction-stir, and TIG welding processes.

=== Z1 truss ===
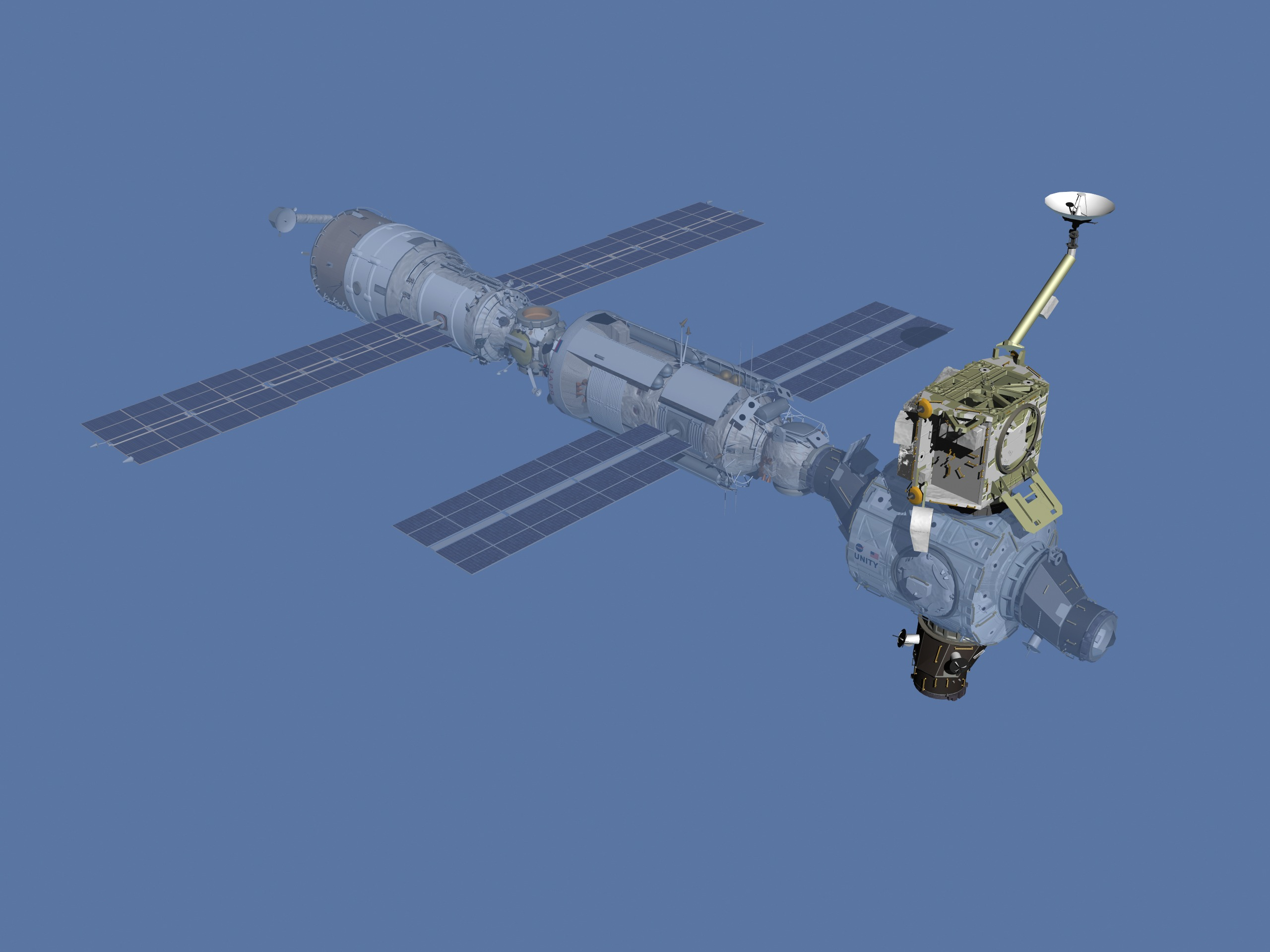
Z1 truss

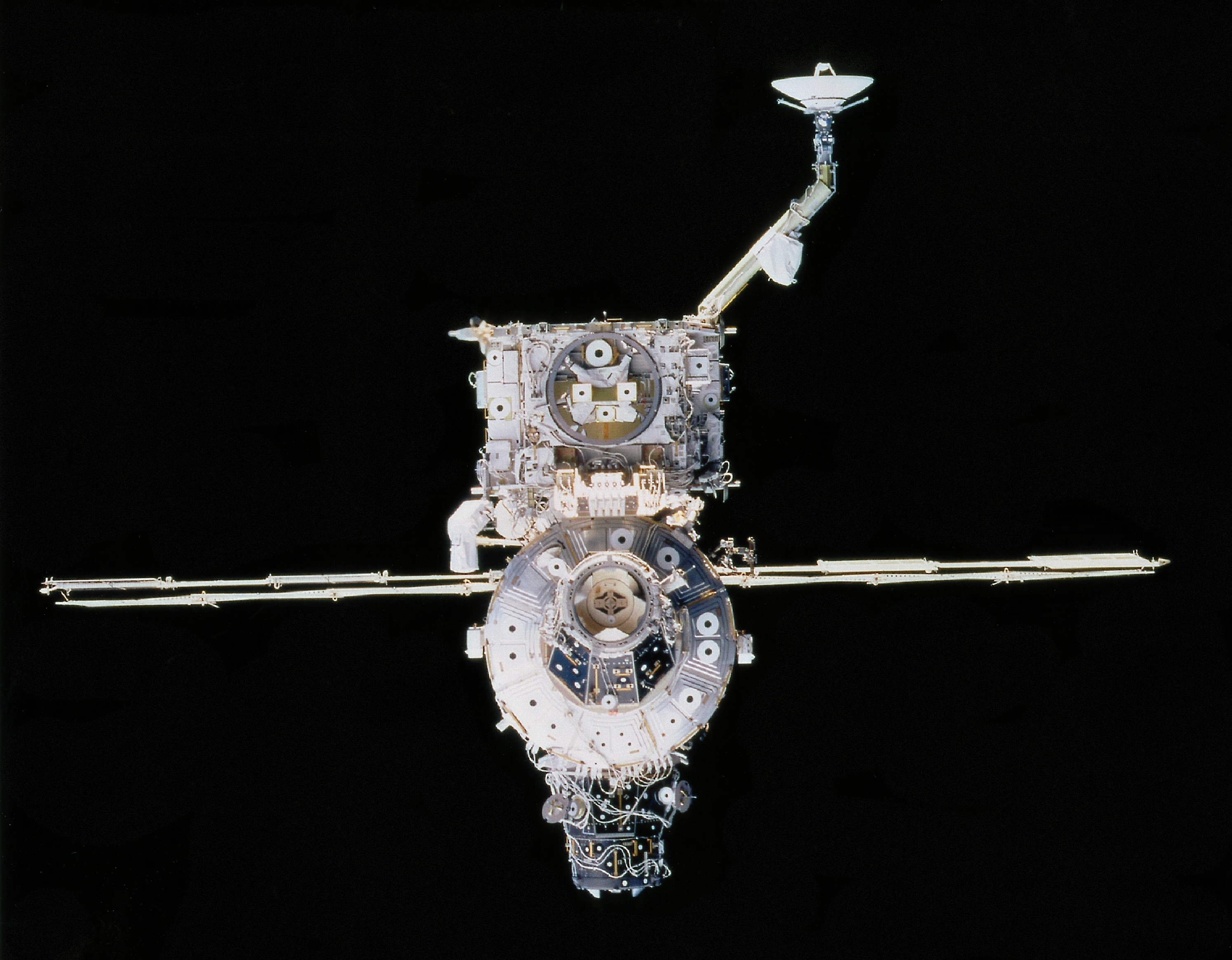
Z1 Truss is above the module

The first truss piece, the Z1 truss, launched aboard STS-92 in October 2000. It contains the control moment gyroscope (CMG) assemblies, electrical wiring, communications equipment, and two plasma contactors designed to neutralize the static electrical charge of the space station.

Another objective of the Z1 truss was to serve as a temporary mounting position for the "P6 truss and solar array" until its relocation to the end of the P5 truss during STS-120. Though not a part of the main truss, the Z1 truss was the first permanent lattice-work structure for the ISS, very much like a girder, setting the stage for the future addition of the station's major trusses or backbones. It is made from stainless steel, titanium, and aluminum alloys.

While the bulk of the Z1 truss is unpressurized, it features a Common Berthing Mechanism (CBM) port that connects its nadir to the zenith port of Unity and contains a small pressurized dome that allowed astronauts to connect electrical ground straps between Unity and the truss without an EVA. In addition, the dome inside the CBM of Z1 can be used as storage space.

The Z1 truss also features a forward-facing Manual Berthing Mechanism (MBM) ring. This MBM is not a port and is not pressurized or electrically powered, but it can be operated with a handheld tool to berth any passive CBM to it. The Z1 truss's MBM was used only once, to temporarily hold PMA-2, while the Destiny lab was being berthed onto the Unity node during STS-98. Since the installation of the nearby S0 truss in April 2002, access to the MBM has been blocked.

In October 2007, the P6 truss element was disconnected from Z1 and moved to P5; P6 will now be permanently connected with P5. The Z1 truss is now solely used to house the CMGs, communications equipment, and the plasma contactors; furthermore, Z1 connects now solely to Unity (Node 1) and no longer houses other space station elements.

In December 2008, the Ad Astra Rocket Company announced an agreement with NASA to place a flight test version of its VASIMR ion thruster on the station to take over reboost duties. In 2013, the thruster module was intended to be placed on top of the Z1 truss in 2015. NASA and Ad Astra signed a contract for development of the VASIMR engine for up to three years in 2015. However, in 2015 NASA ended plans for flying the VF-200 to the ISS. A NASA spokesperson stated that the ISS "was not an ideal demonstration platform for the desired performance level of the engines". (An example of a spacecraft that used an ion thruster to maintain its orbit was the Gravity Field and Steady-State Ocean Circulation Explorer, whose engine allowed it to maintain a very low orbit.)

An animation displaying different views of the Z1 Truss which was installed on the International Space Station by the crew of STS-92.

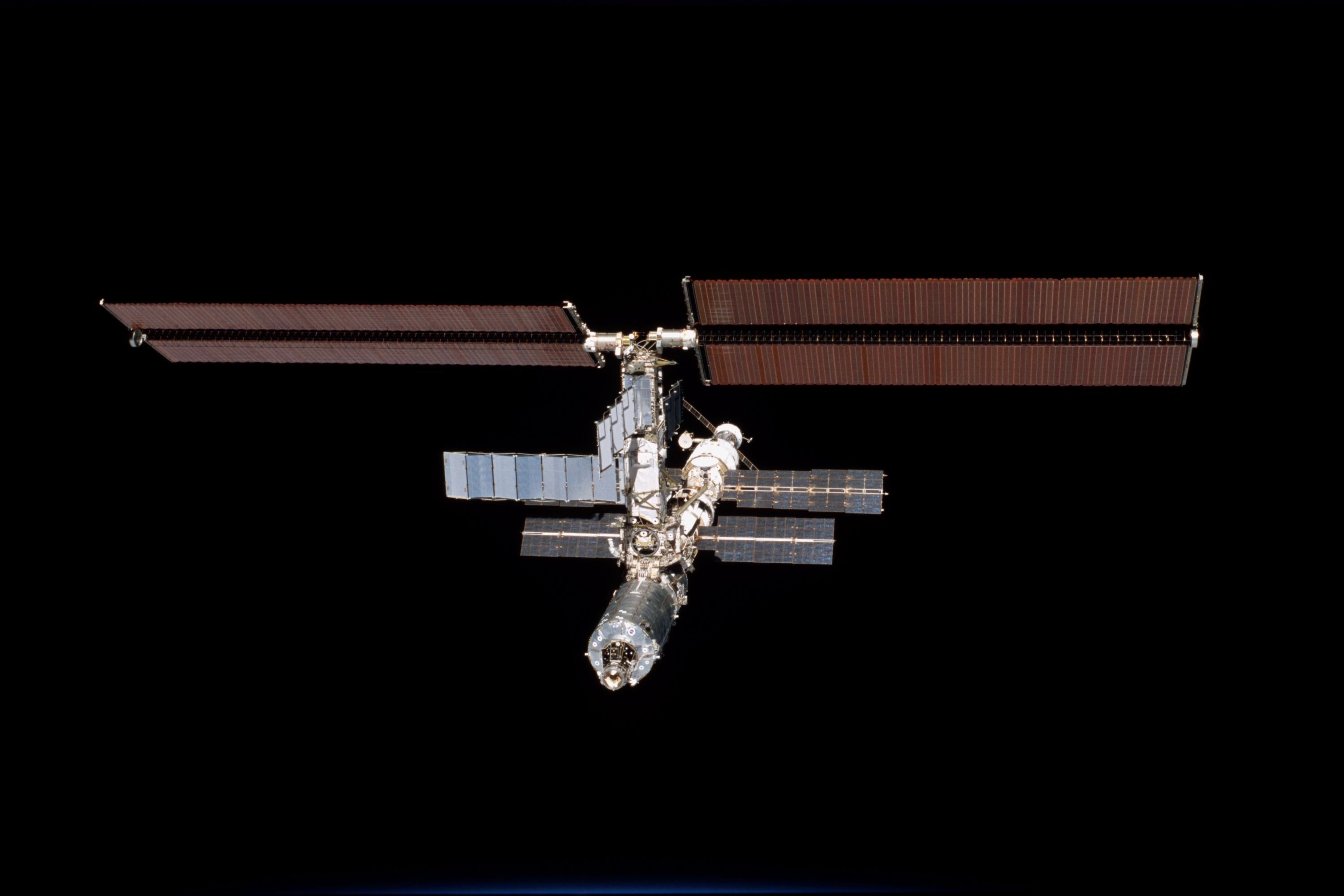
This 2001 photo shows the alternate configuration of the truss, in which Z1 Truss was a critical element between the solar arrays and the modules. Photo includes the P6 solar array.

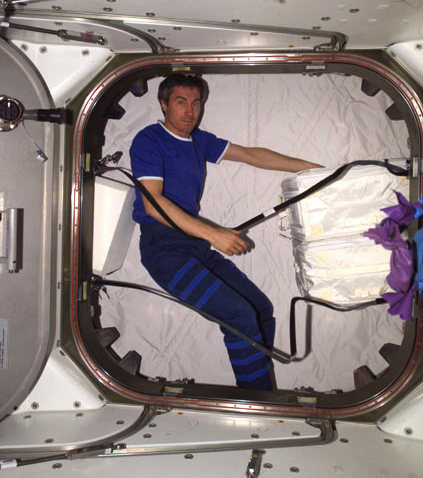
Expedition 11 commander Sergei K. Krikalev inside the Z1 truss dome.

=== S0 truss ===
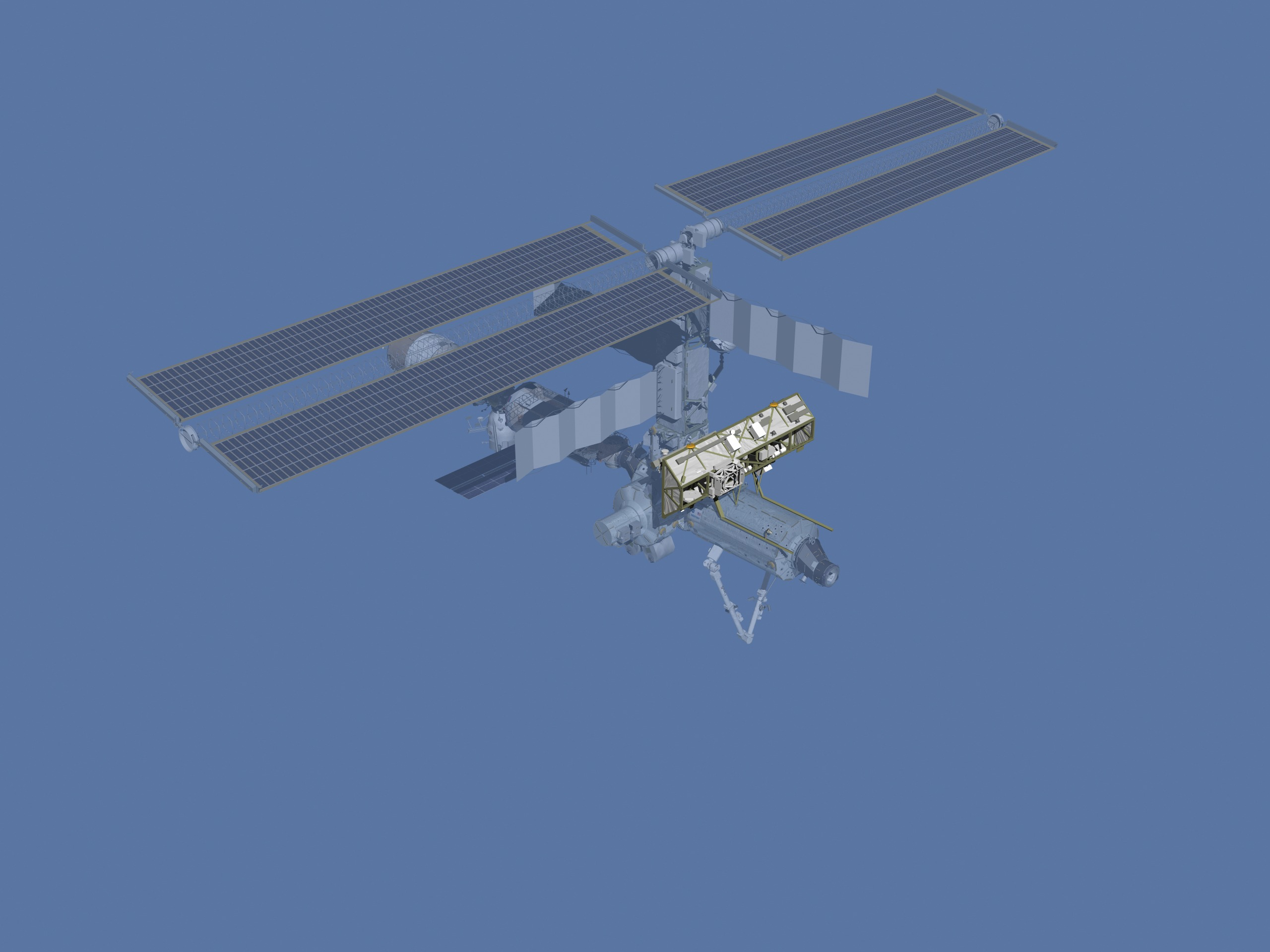
S0 truss

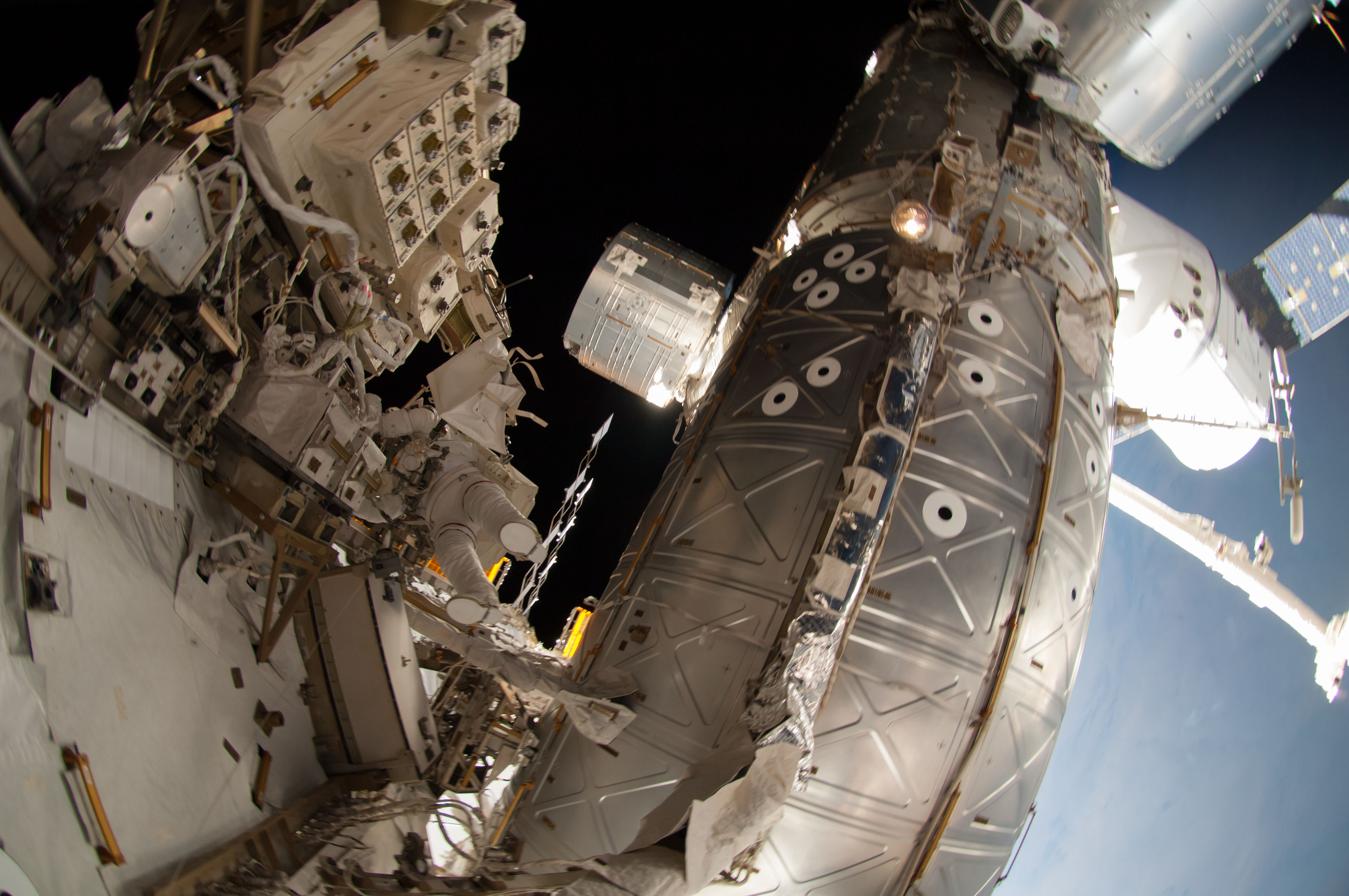
S0 truss steel mount structure connecting to the US lab

The S0 truss, (also called the Center Integrated Truss Assembly Starboard 0 Truss) forms the central backbone of the Space Station. It was attached on the top of the Destiny Laboratory Module during STS-110 in April 2002. S0 is used to route power to the pressurized station modules and conduct heat away from the modules to the S1 and P1 Trusses. The S0 truss is not docked to the ISS but is connected to the Destiny Lab module by both the Module-to-Truss Structure Attachment System (MTSAS) and four Module-to-Truss Structure (MTS) extruded aluminum struts. The Module-to-Truss Structure Attachment System is in two halves. The active half Lab Cradle Assembly bolted to the aft and mid-rings of the Destiny Lab and the passive half grapple bar and alignment pins integral to S0.

=== P1, S1 trusses ===
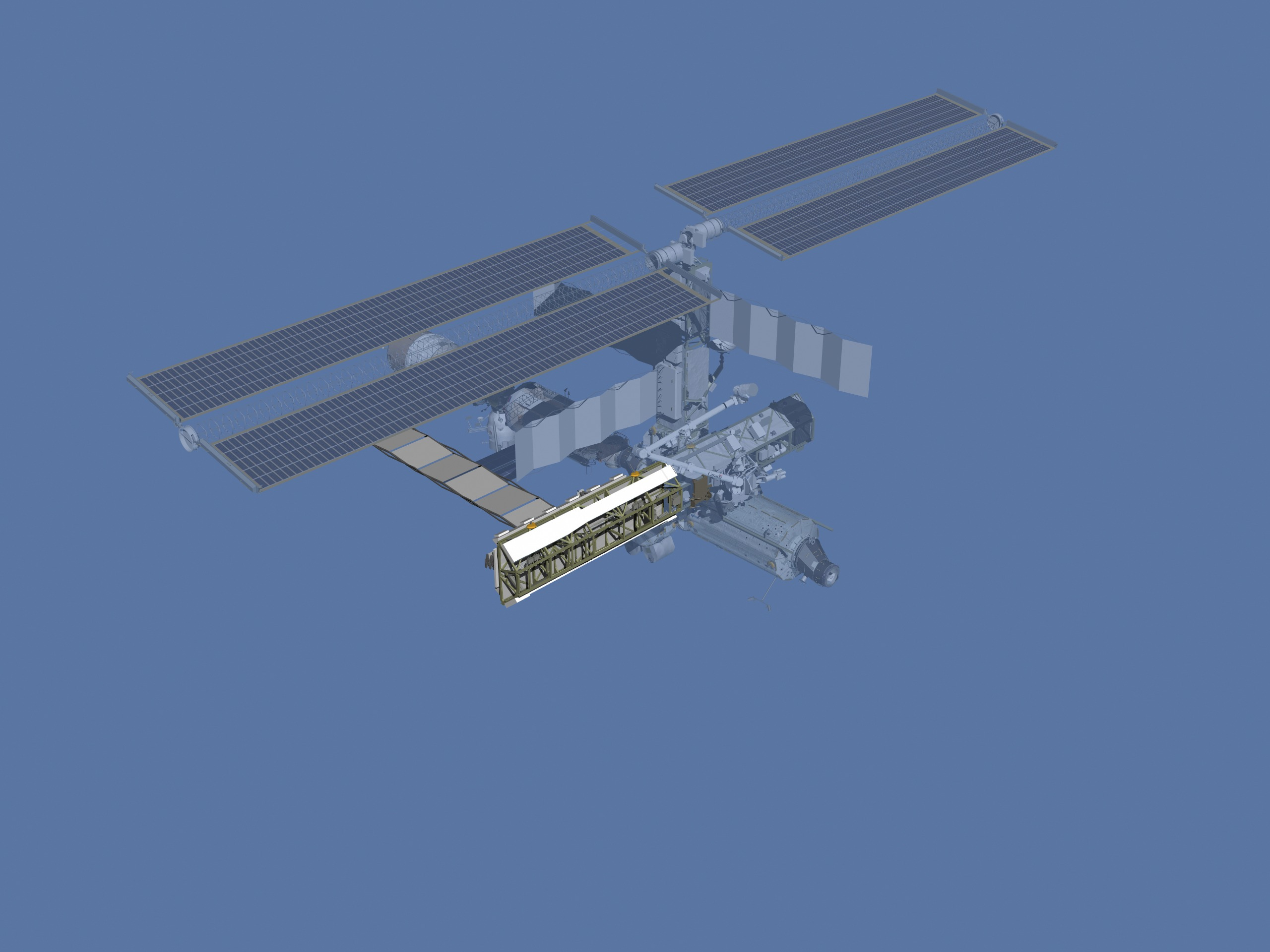
S1 truss

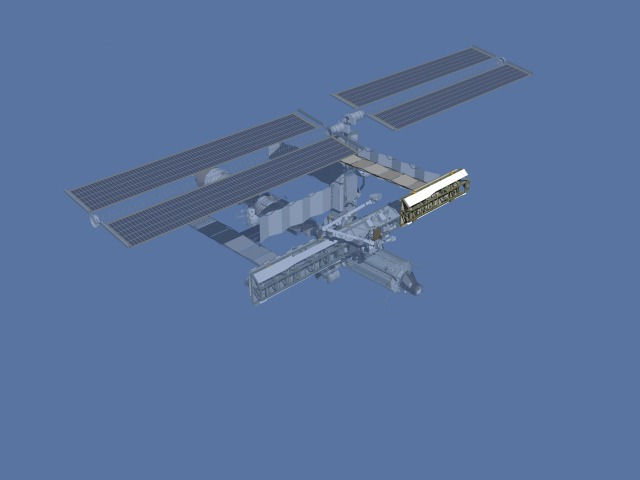
P1 truss

The P1 and S1 trusses (also called the Port and Starboard Side Thermal Radiator Trusses) are attached to the S0 truss and contain carts to transport the Canadarm2 and astronauts to worksites along with the space station. They each flow 290 kg (637 lb) of anhydrous ammonia through three heat rejection radiators. The S1 truss was launched on STS-112 in October 2002 and the P1 truss was launched on STS-113 in November 2002. Detailed design, test, and construction of the S1 and P1 structures were conducted by McDonnell Douglas (now Boeing) in Huntington Beach, CA. First parts were cut for the structure in 1996, and delivery of the first truss occurred in 1999.

=== P2, S2 trusses ===
The P2 and S2 trusses were planned as locations for rocket thrusters in the original design for Space Station Freedom. Since the Russian parts of the ISS also provided that capability, the reboost capability of the Space Station Freedom design was no longer needed at that location. As such, P2 and S2 were canceled.

=== P3/P4, S3/S4 truss assemblies ===
The components and the unfolding of the P3/P4 Truss in Detail (Animation)

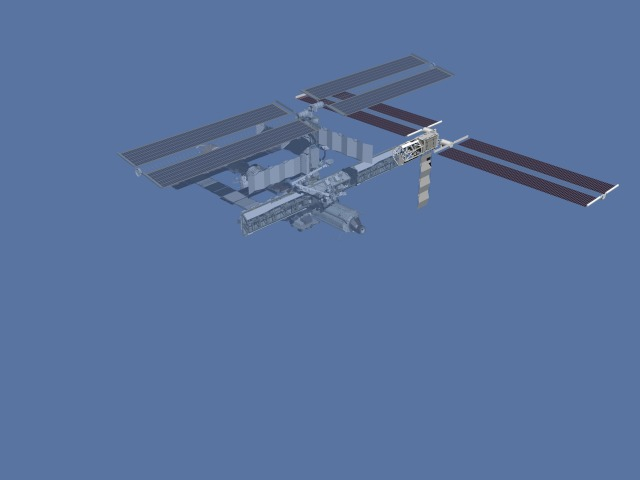
P3/P4 truss

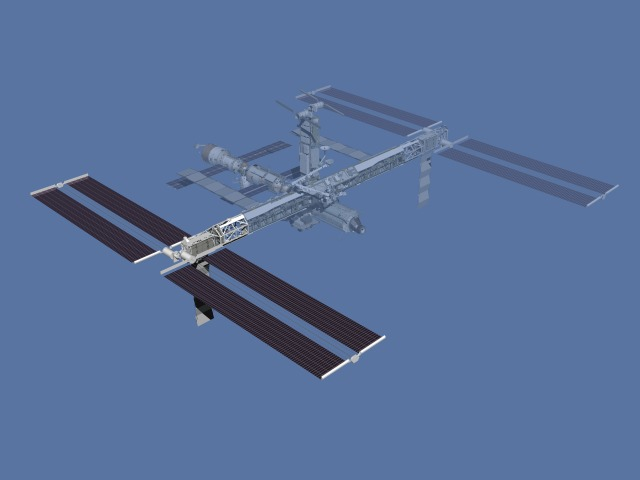
S3/S4 truss

The P3/P4 truss assembly was installed by the Space Shuttle Atlantis STS-115 mission, launched September 9, 2006, and attached to the P1 segment. The P3 and P4 segments together contain a pair of solar arrays, a radiator, and a rotary joint that will aim the solar arrays, and connects P3 to P4. Upon its installation, no power was flowing across the rotary joint, so the electricity generated by the P4 solar array wings was only being used on the P4 segment and not the rest of the station. Then in December 2006, a major electrical rewiring of the station by STS-116 routed this power to the entire grid. The S3/S4 truss assembly—a mirror-image of P3/P4—was installed on June 11, 2007, also by Space Shuttle Atlantis during flight STS-117, mission 13A and mounted to the S1 truss segment. It is the heaviest station-bound module ever launched by the Space Shuttle.

Major P3 and S3 subsystems include the Segment-to-Segment Attach System (SSAS), Solar Alpha Rotary Joint (SARJ), and Unpressurized Cargo Carrier Attach System (UCCAS). The primary functions of the P3 truss segment are to provide mechanical, power and data interfaces to payloads attached to the two UCCAS platforms; axial indexing for solar tracking, or rotating of the arrays to follow the sun, via the SARJ; movement and worksite accommodations for the Mobile Transporter. The P3/S3 primary structure is made of a hexagonal-shaped aluminum structure and includes four bulkheads and six longerons. The S3 truss also supports EXPRESS Logistics Carrier locations, first to be launched and installed in the 2009 time frame.

Major subsystems of the P4 and S4 Photovoltaic Modules (PVM) include the two Solar Array Wings (SAW), the Photovoltaic Radiator (PVR), the Alpha Joint Interface Structure (AJIS), and Modified Rocketdyne Truss Attachment System (MRTAS), and Beta Gimbal Assembly (BGA).

Years later, to augment the deteriorating solar cells in the SAWs, Roll Out Solar Arrays 3 and 4 were added in front of the old 3A SAW on the S4 truss and 4A SAW on the P4 truss, in December 2022. iROSA 5 was added in front of the old 1B SAW on the S4 truss in June 2023, and iROSA 7 was added in front of the old 2A SAW on the P4 truss in October 2026.

=== P5, S5 trusses ===
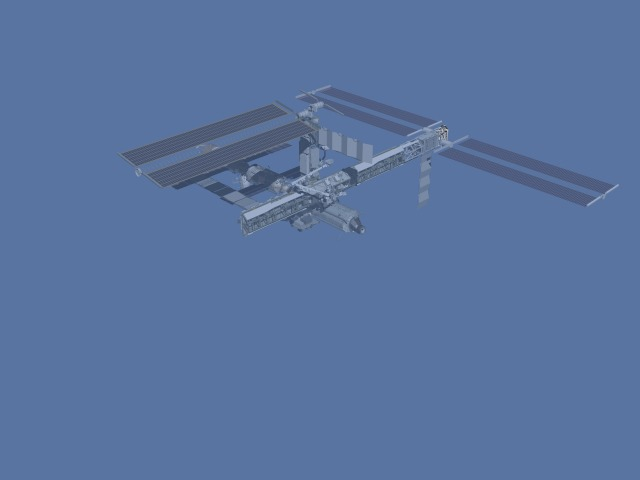
P5 truss

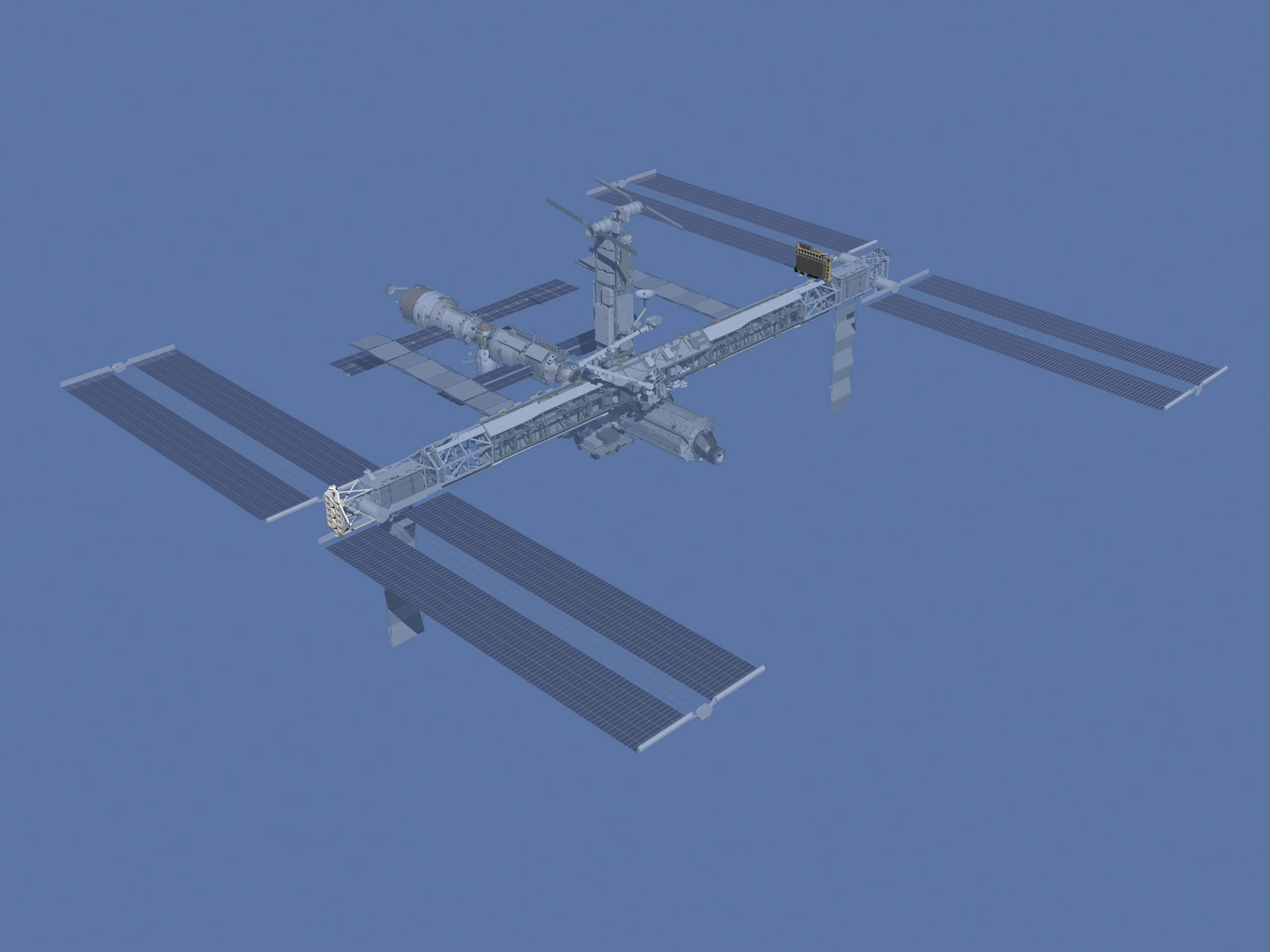
S5 truss

The P5 and S5 trusses are connectors that support the P6 and S6 trusses, respectively. The P3/P4 and S3/S4 truss assemblies' length was limited by the cargo bay capacity of the Space Shuttle, so these small (3.37 m long) connectors are needed to extend the truss. The P5 truss was installed on December 12, 2006, during the first EVA of mission STS-116. The S5 truss was brought into orbit by mission STS-118 and installed on August 11, 2007.

=== P6, S6 trusses ===
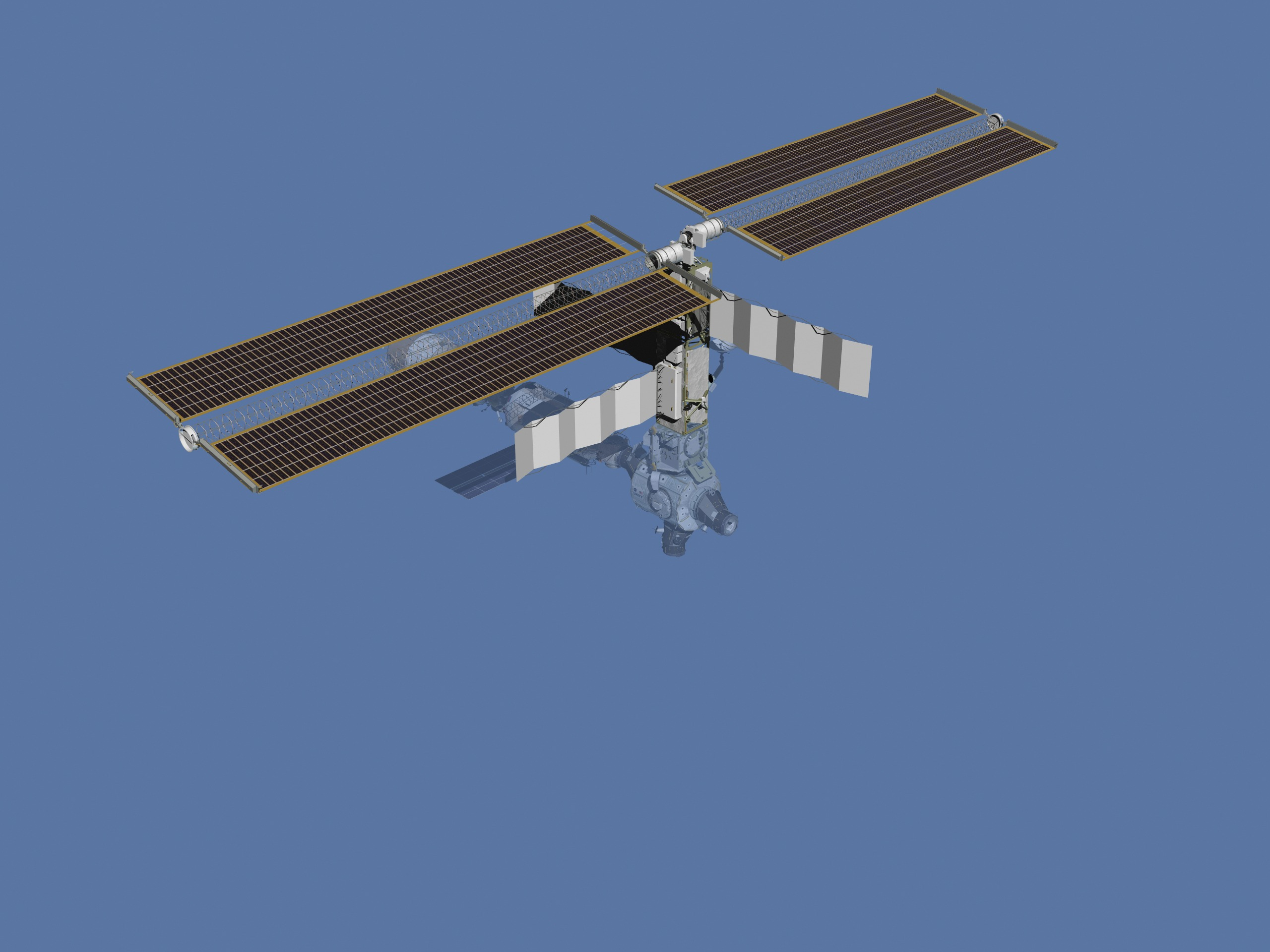
P6 truss

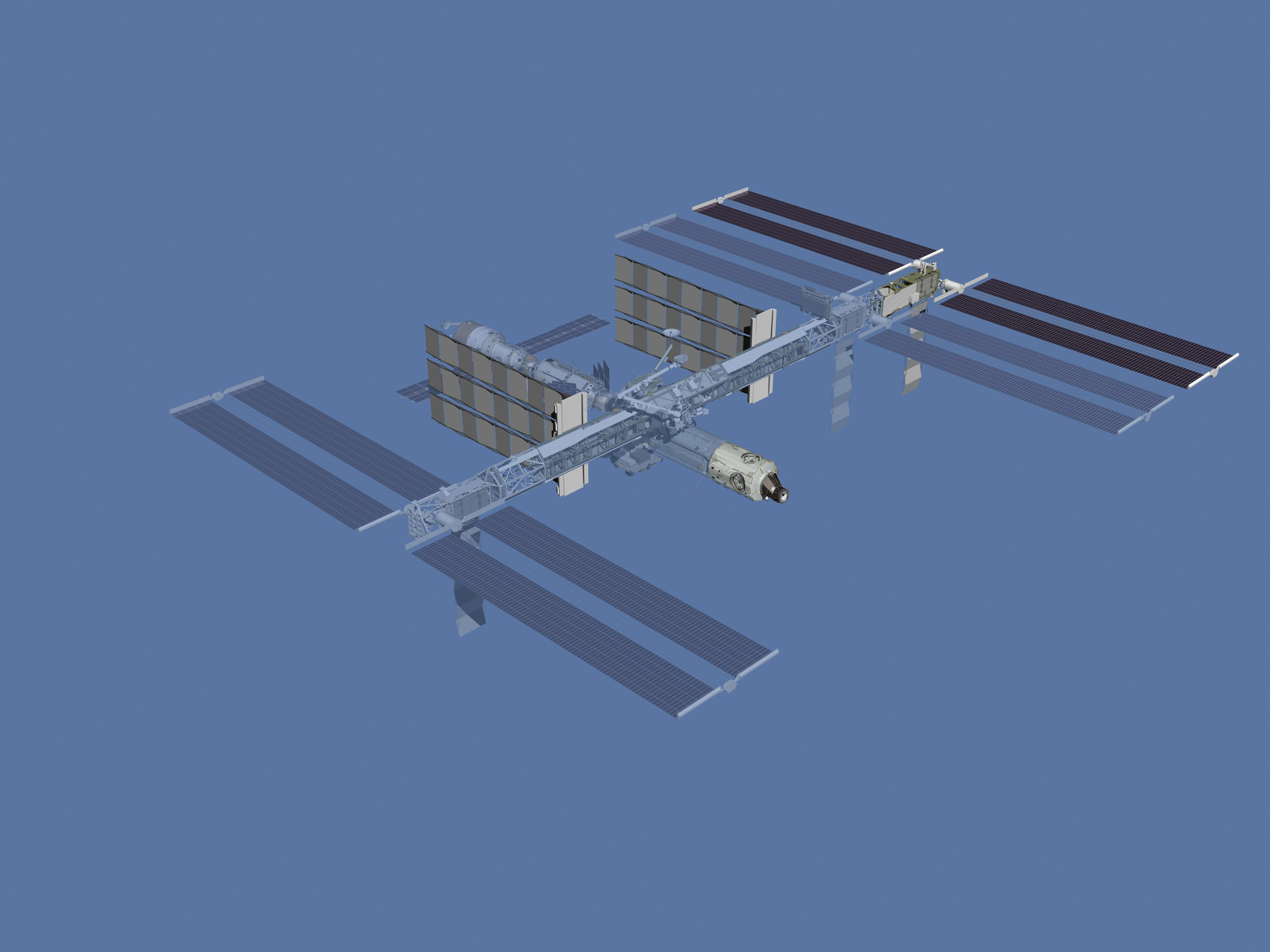
P6 truss after relocation

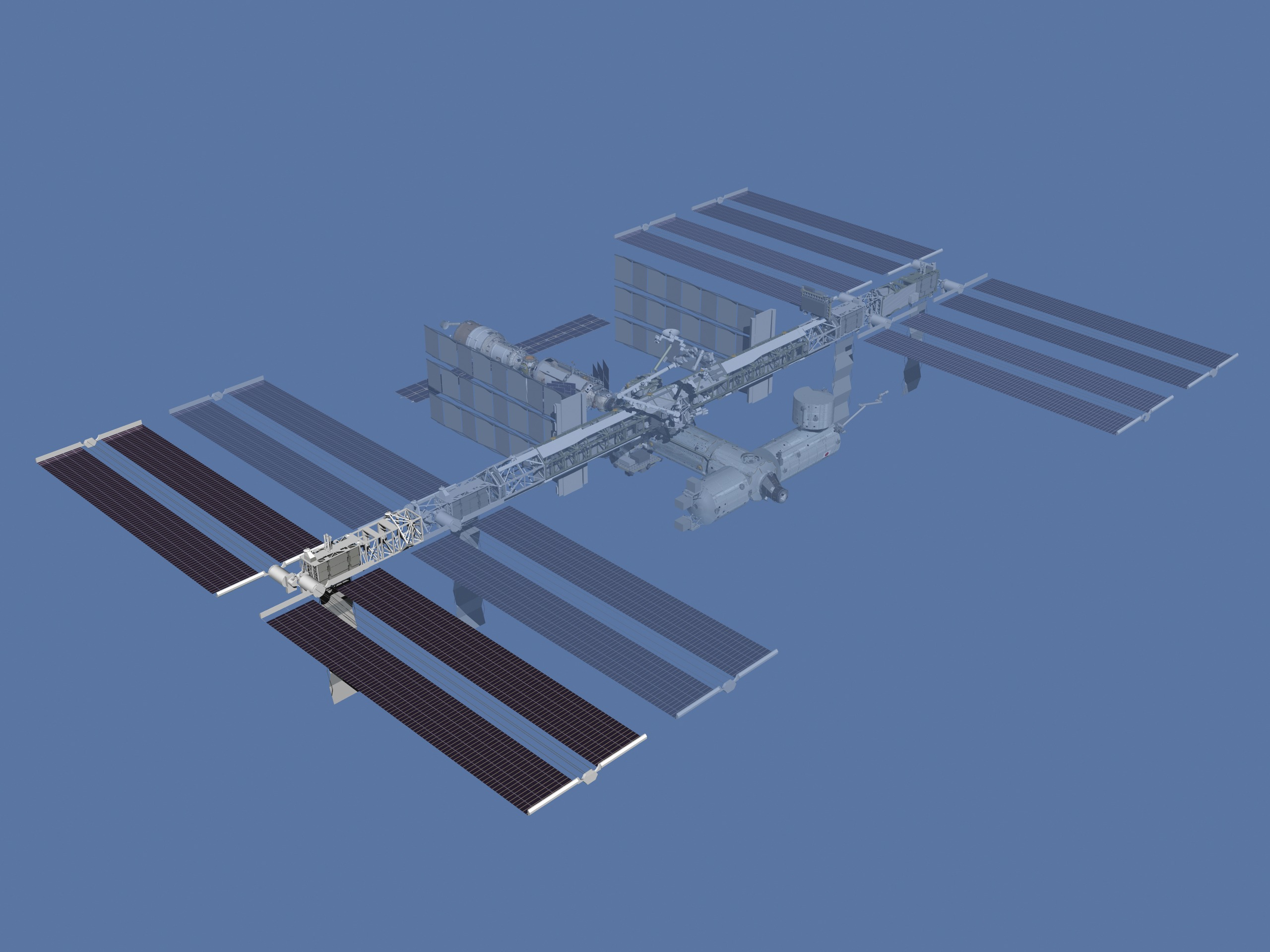
S6 truss

The P6 truss was the second truss segment to be added because it contains a large Solar Array Wing (SAW) that generated essential electricity for the station, prior to activation of the SAW on the P4 truss. It was originally mounted to the Z1 truss and had its SAW extended during STS-97, but the SAW was folded, one half at a time, to make room for the SAWs on the P4 and S4 trusses, during STS-116 and STS-117 respectively. Shuttle mission STS-120 (assembly mission 10A) detached the P6 truss from Z1, remounted it on the P5 truss, redeployed its radiator panels, and attempted to redeploy its SAWs. One SAW (2B) was deployed successfully but the second SAW (4B) developed a significant tear that temporarily stopped deployment at around 80%. This was subsequently fixed and the array is now fully deployed. A later assembly mission (the out of sequence STS-119) mounted the S6 truss on the S5 truss, which provided a fourth and final set of solar arrays and radiators.

Years later, iROSAs 1 and 2 were added in front of the old 4B and 2B SAWs on the P6 truss in June 2021, and iROSAs 6 and 8 were added in front of the old 1B and 3B SAWs on the S6 truss in June 2023 and November 2026 respectively.

=== Gallery of Trusses ===
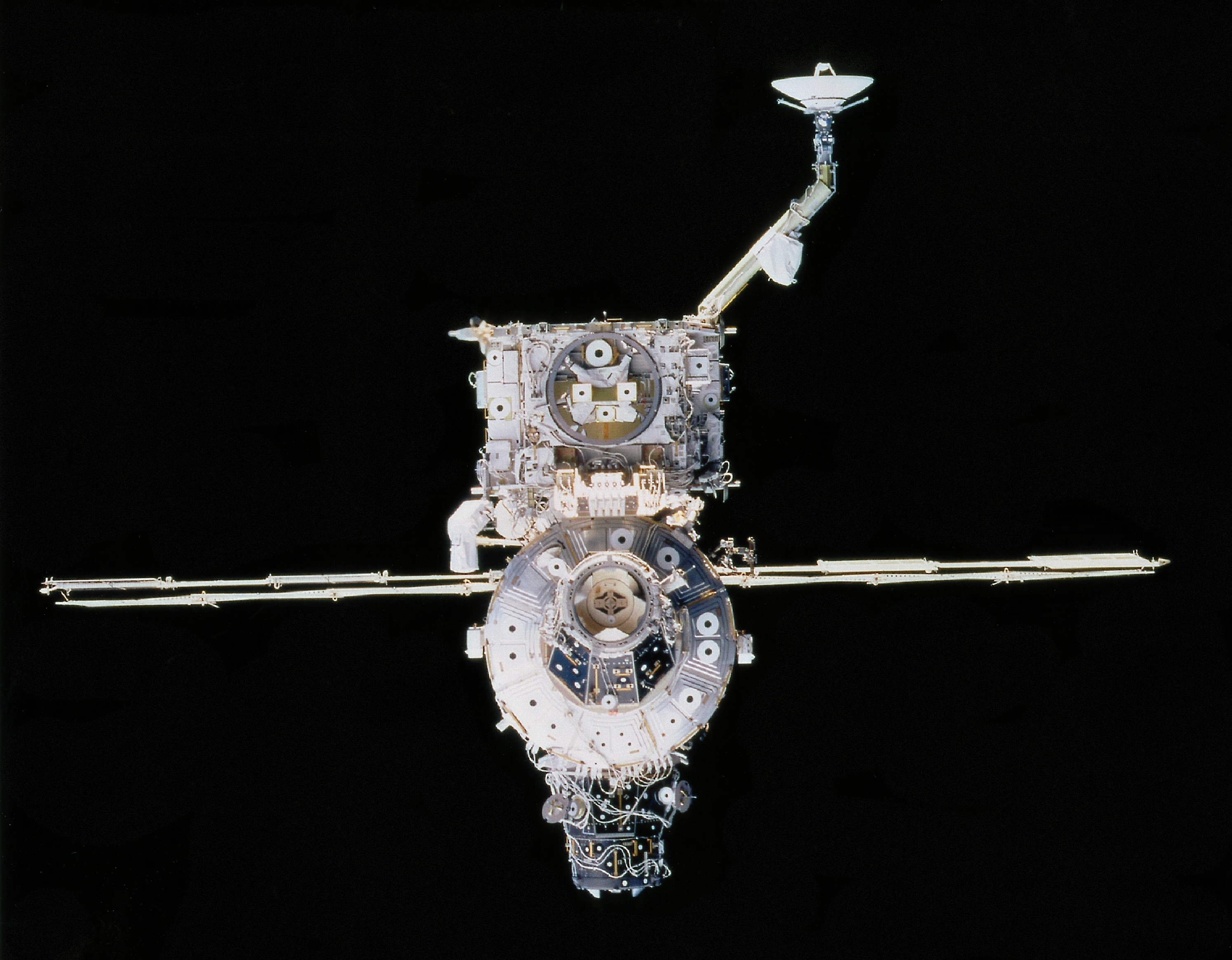
Z1 truss (above) and Unity Module (below) from STS-92 in October 2000

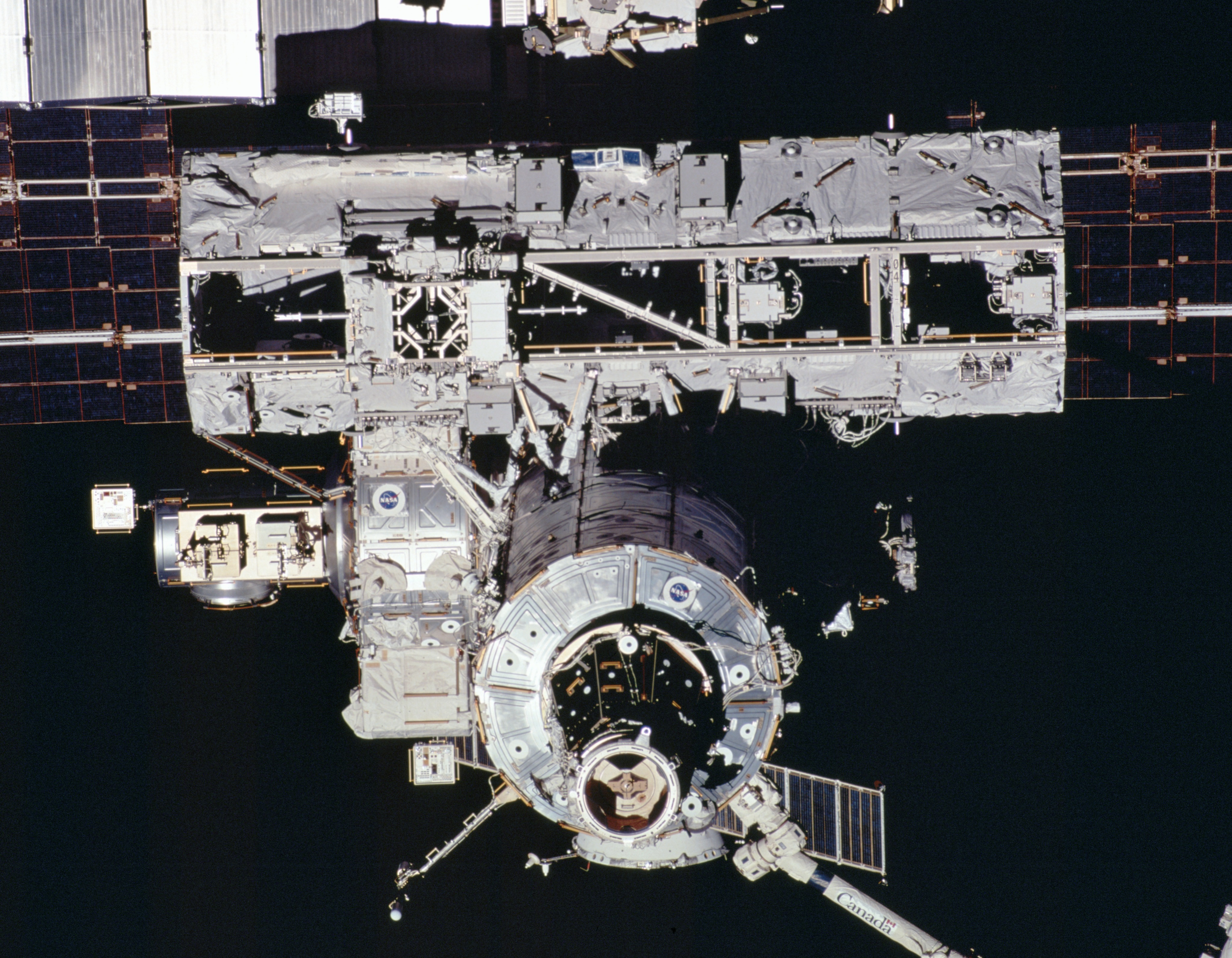
The S0 truss (above) from STS-110 April 17, 2002

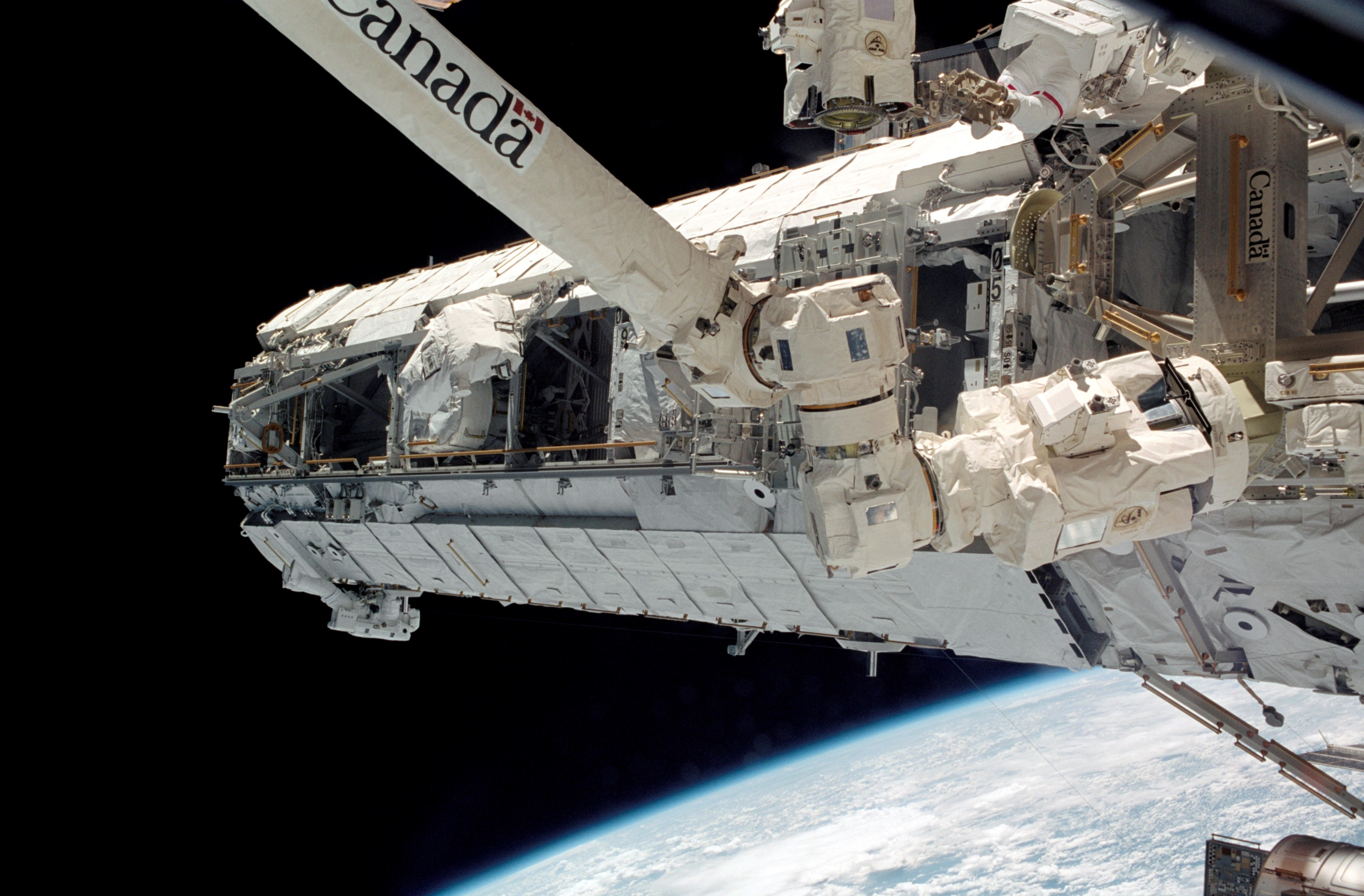
ISS S1 truss element being installed on STS-112 October 10, 2002

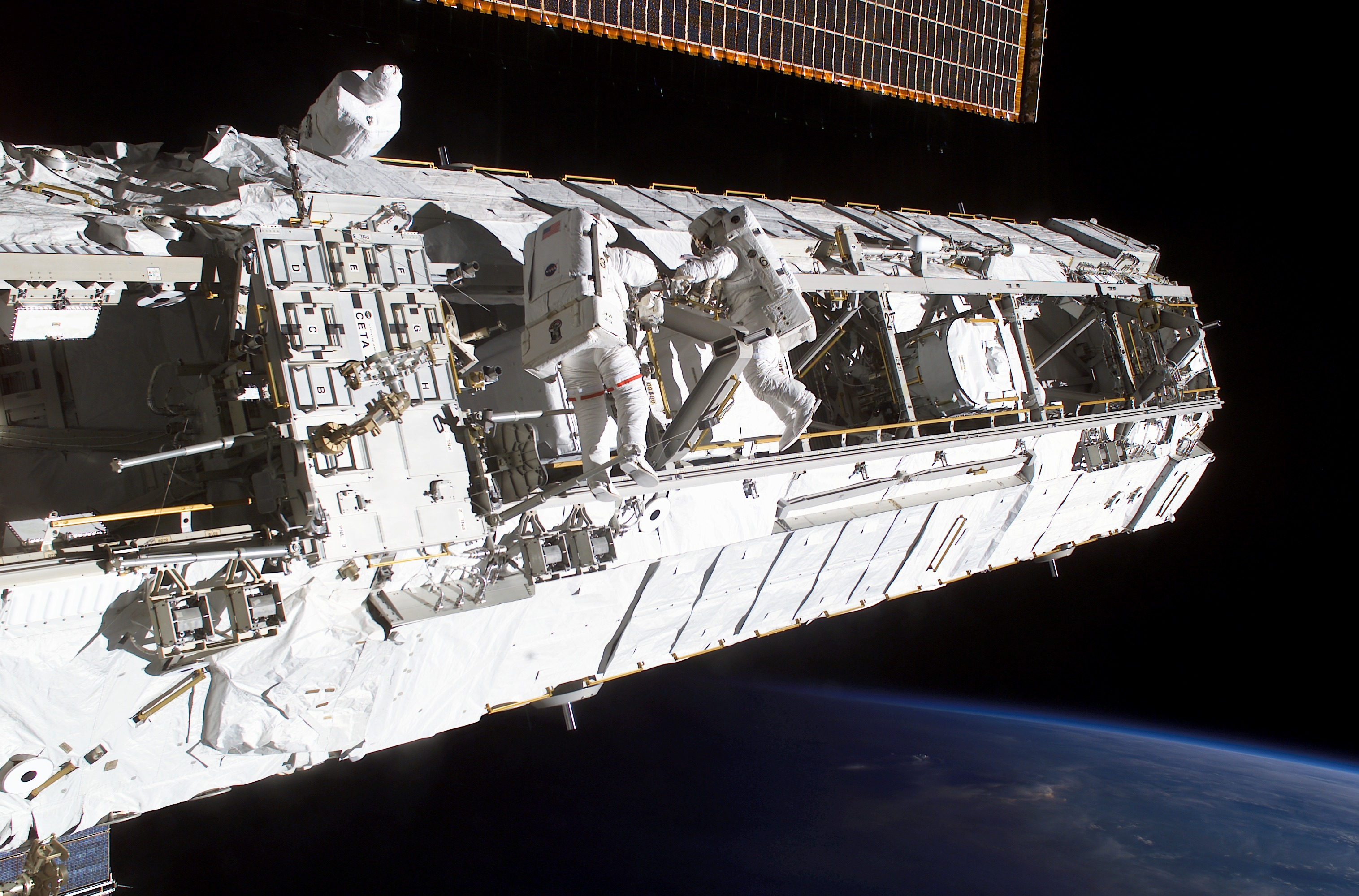
ISS P1 truss element being installed on STS-113 November 28, 2002

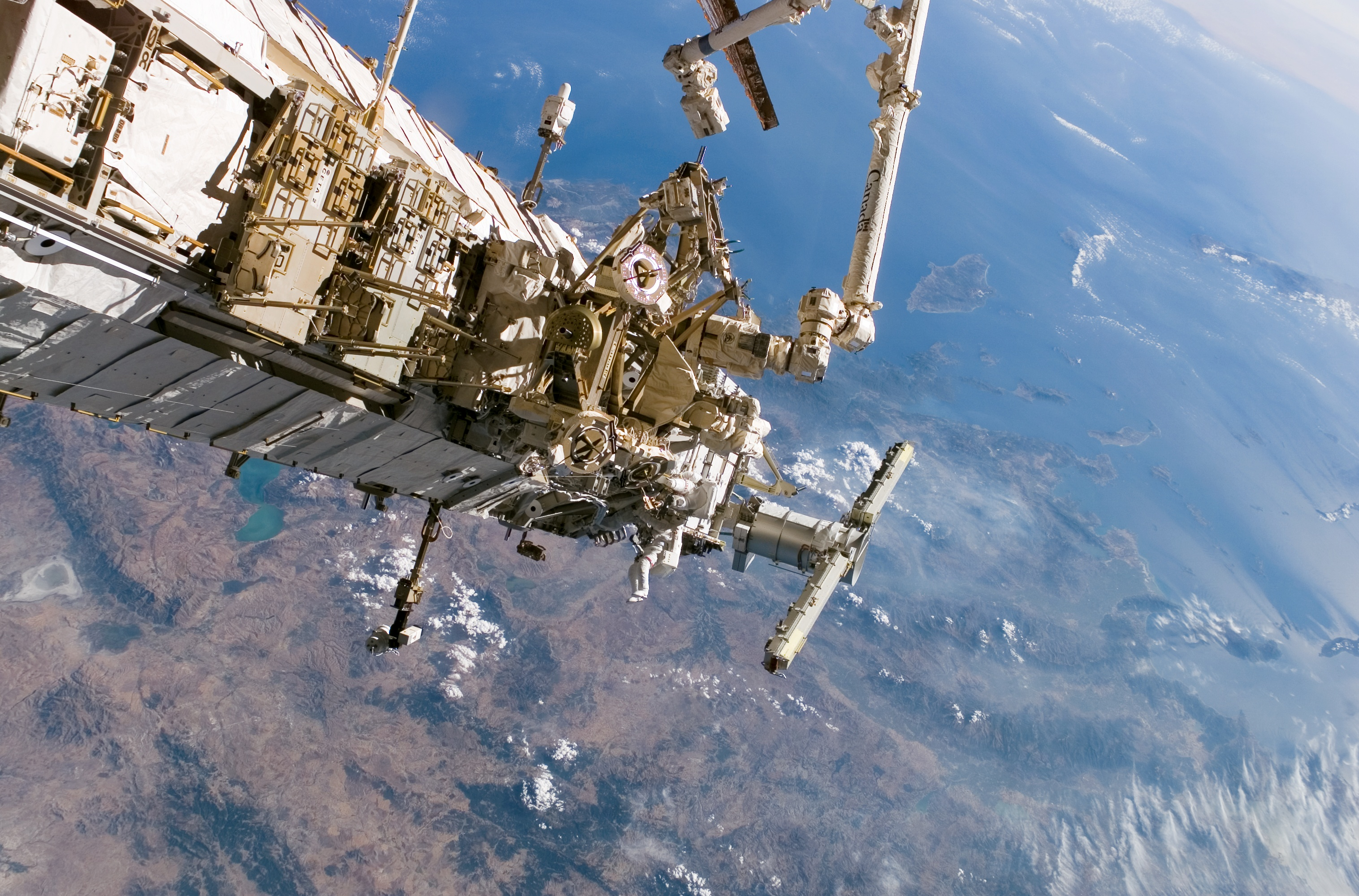
The P3/P4 truss assembly being installed during STS-115 September 13, 2006. Astronauts give scale to the image.

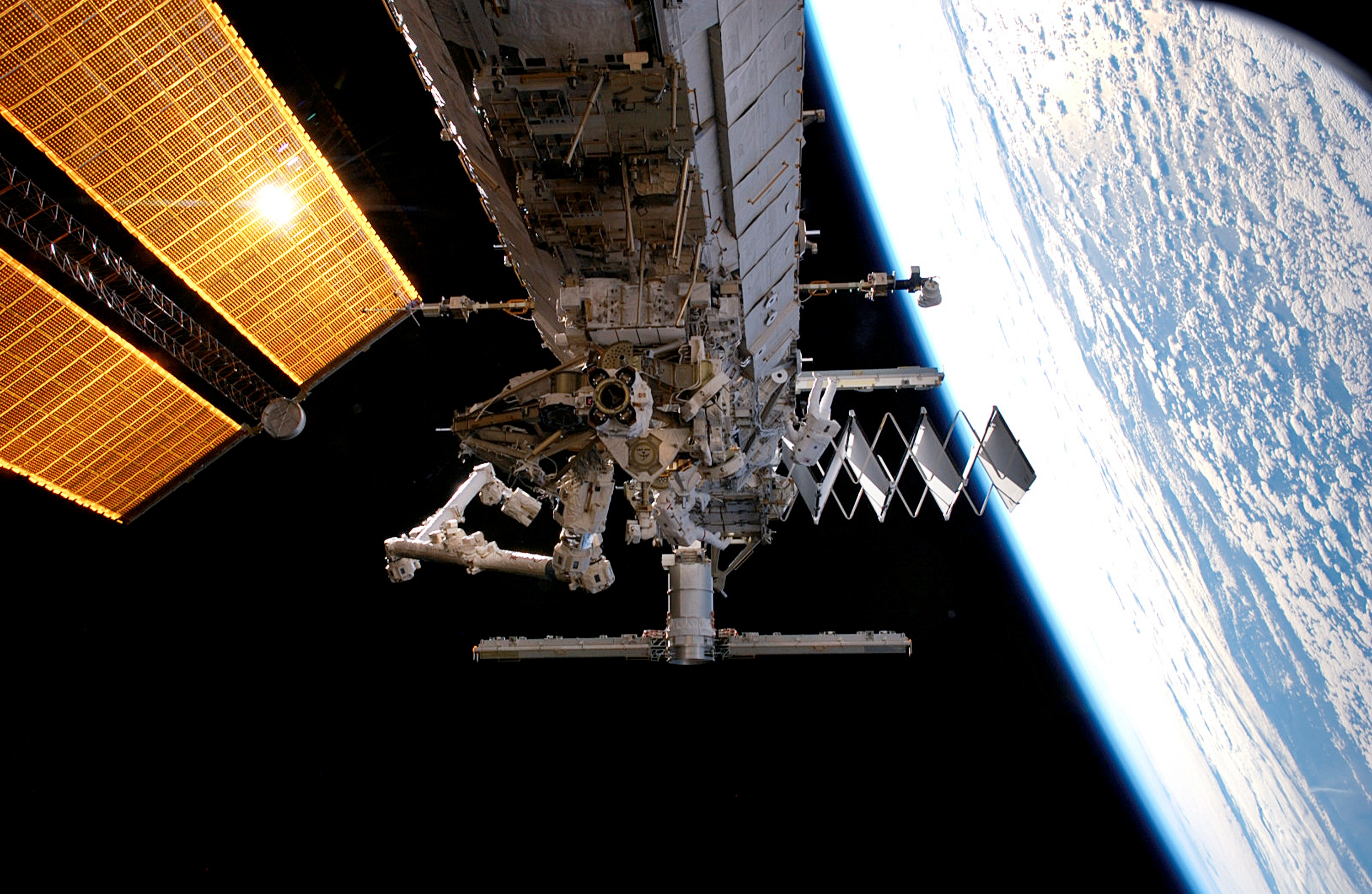
The newly installed S3/S4 truss assembly during the first EVA of mission STS-117 on June 11, 2007.

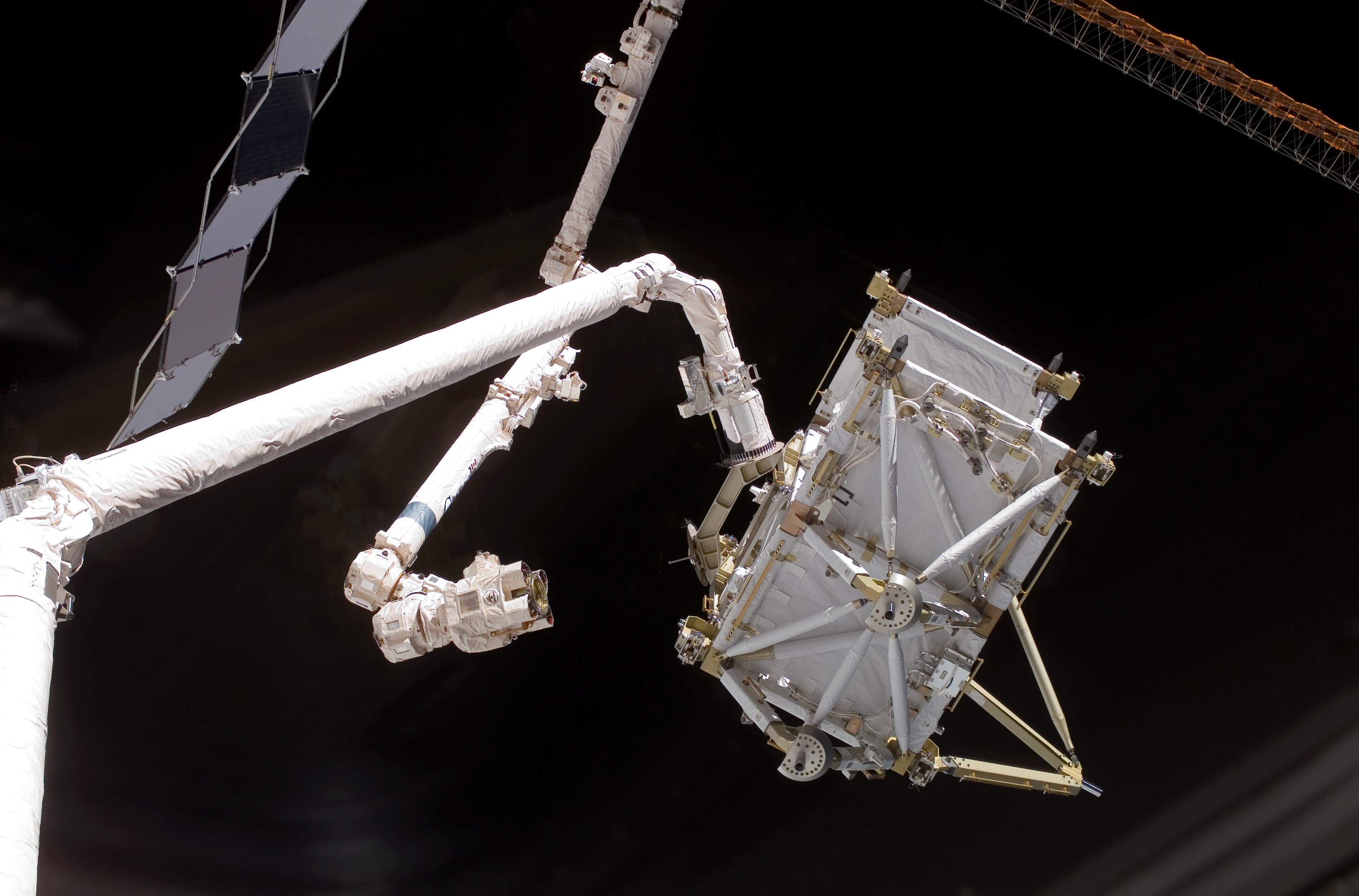
Space Shuttle Discovery's Canadarm-1 robotic arm hands off the P5 truss section to the International Space Station's Canadarm-2 during shuttle mission STS-116 in December 2006.

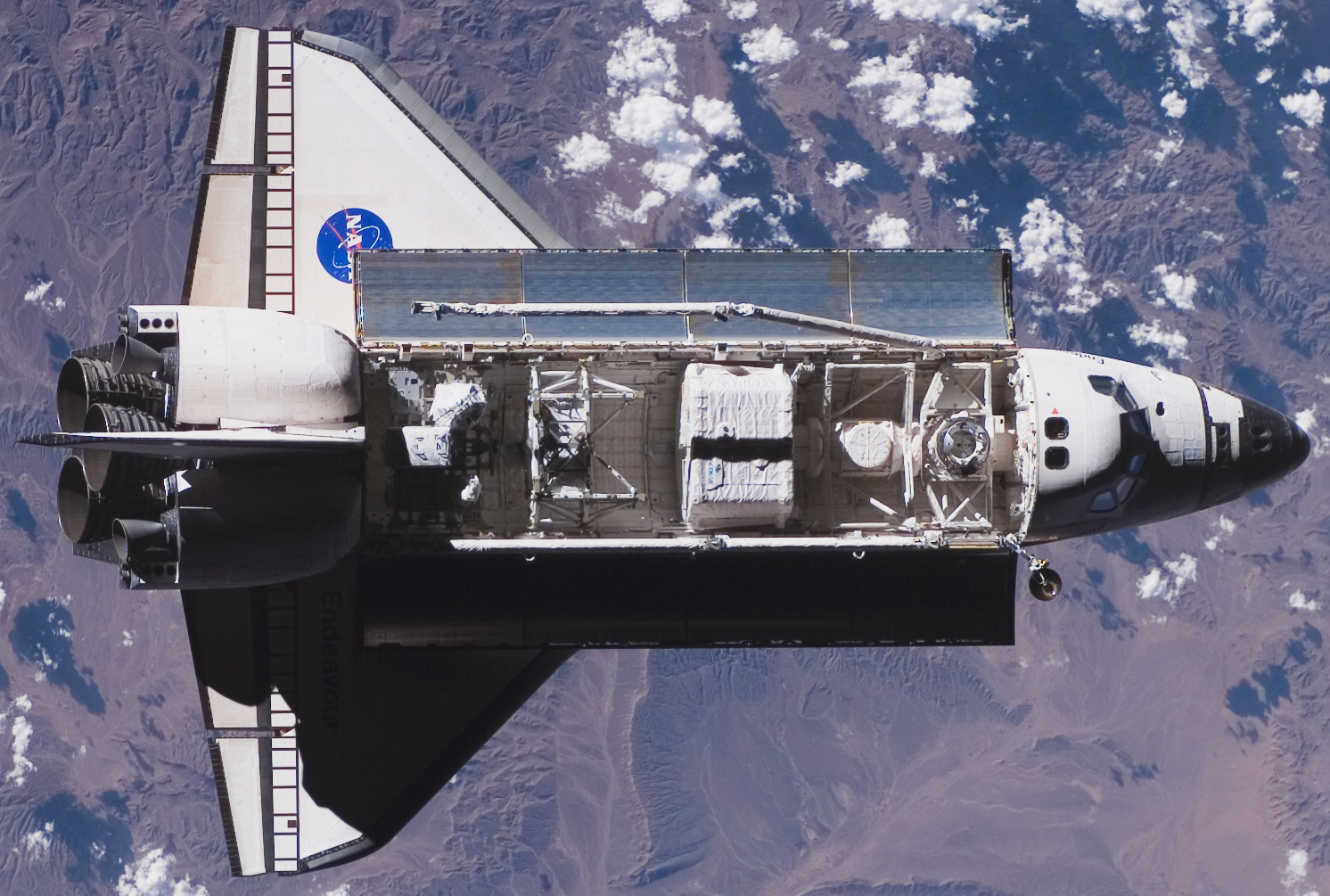
Space Shuttle Endeavour approaches the International Space Station during mission STS-118 with the S5 truss section ready to be installed.

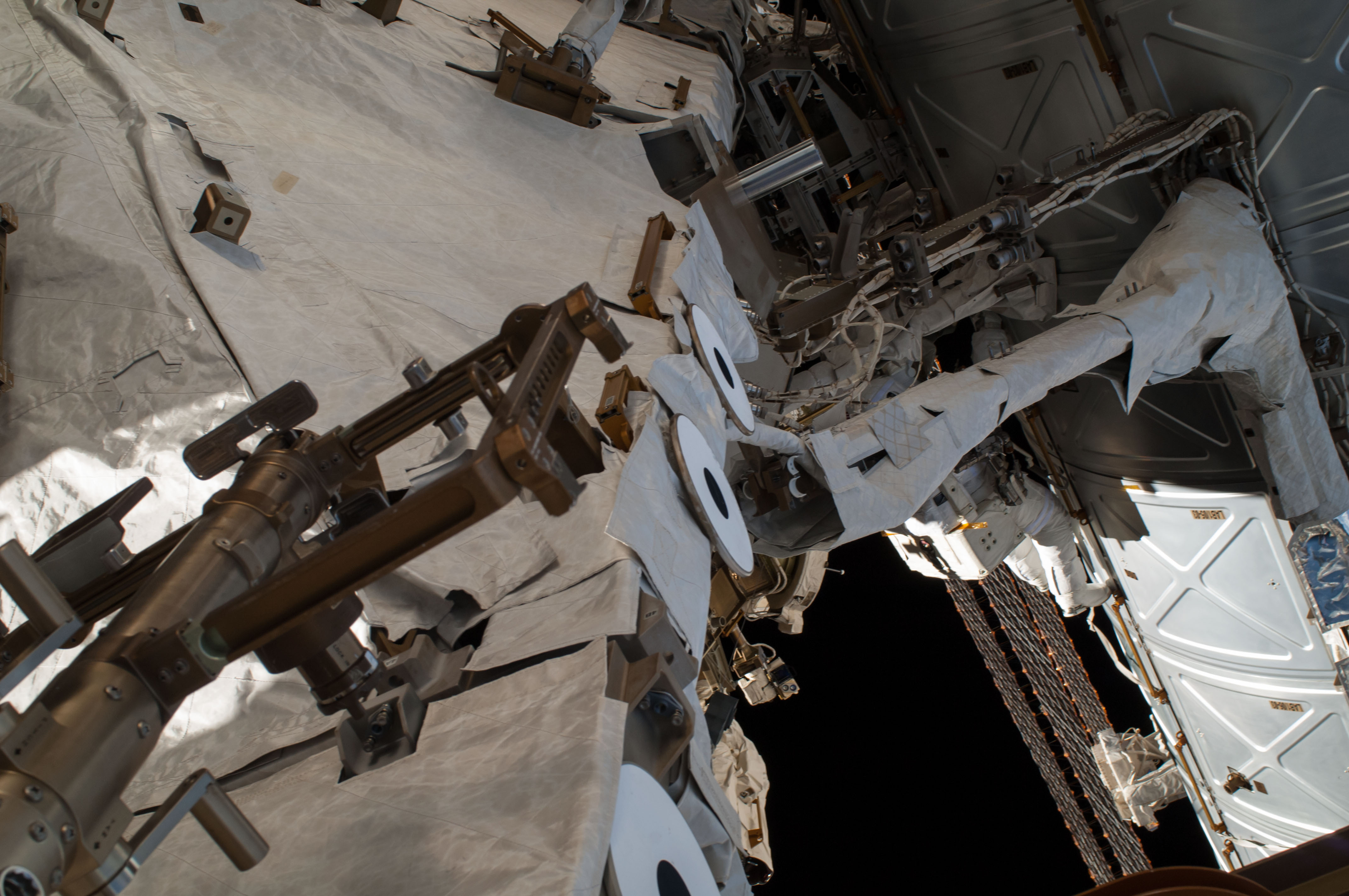
EVA view of structural aluminum framework

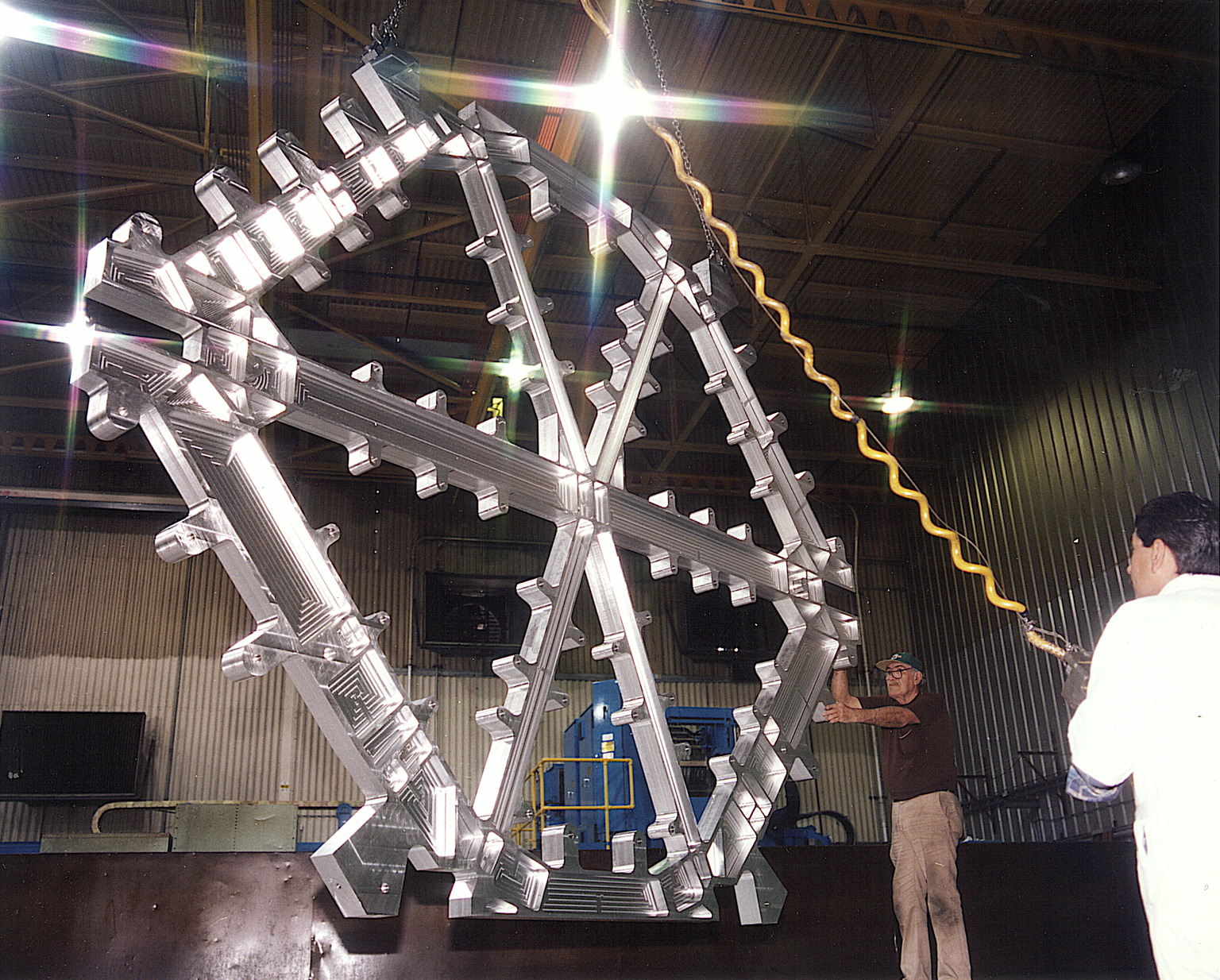
S0 truss test article center bulkhead manufacturing at Boeing in Huntington Beach

== Truss subsystems ==
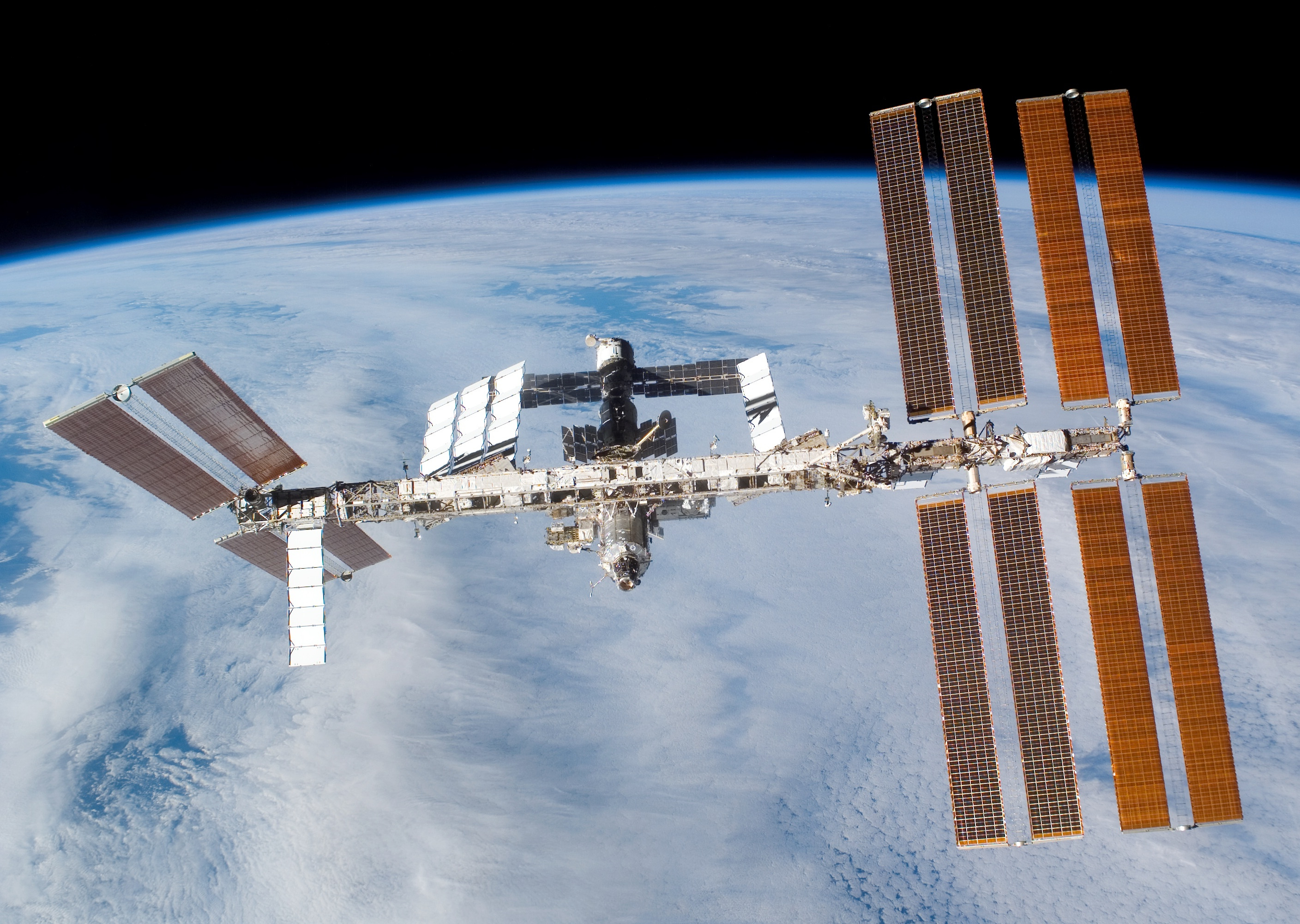
International Space Station on November 5, 2007 after relocation of the P6 truss assembly (far right) by STS-120

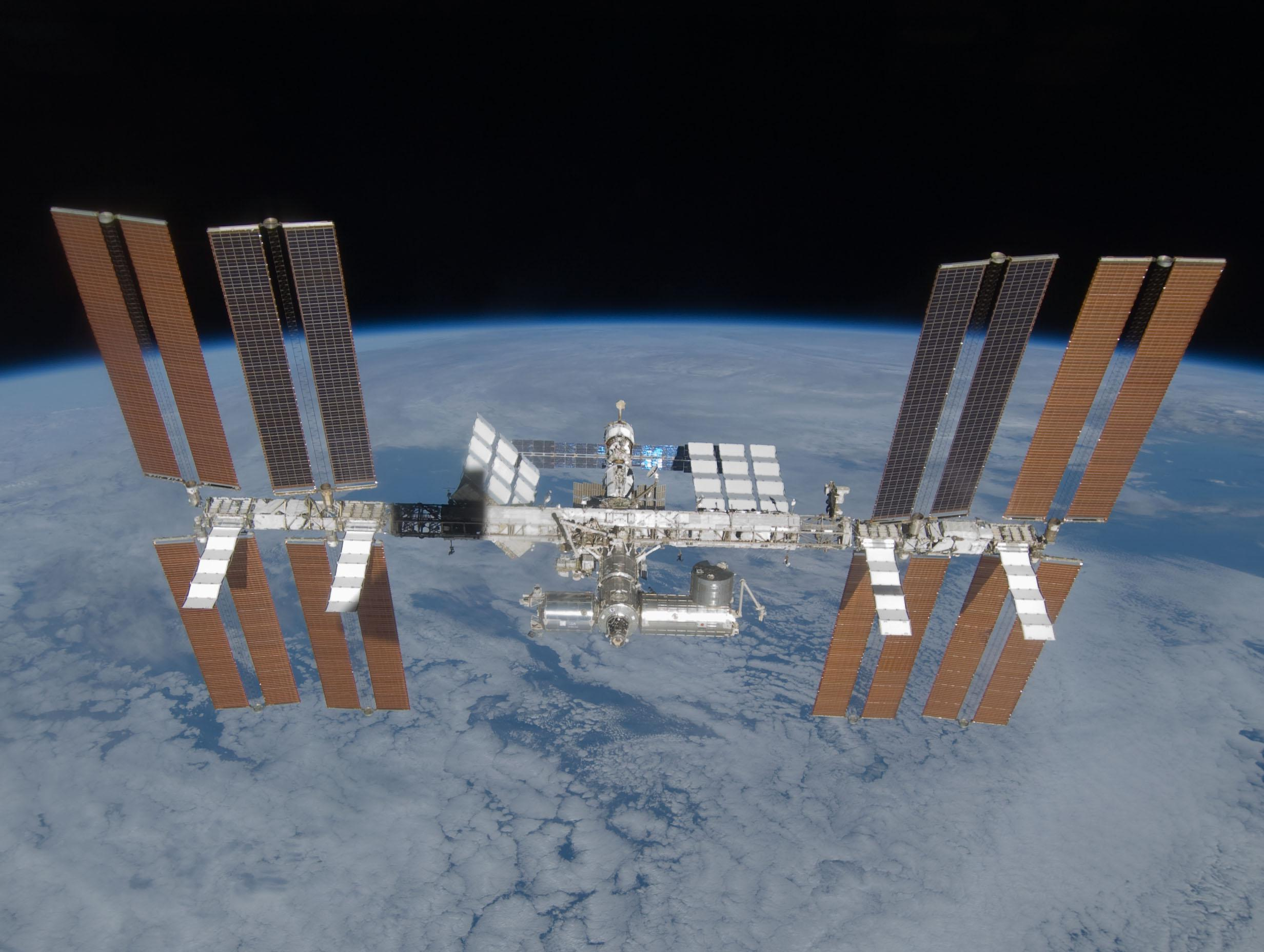
The space station, showing the completed truss assembly (as of March 2009)

=== Solar arrays ===
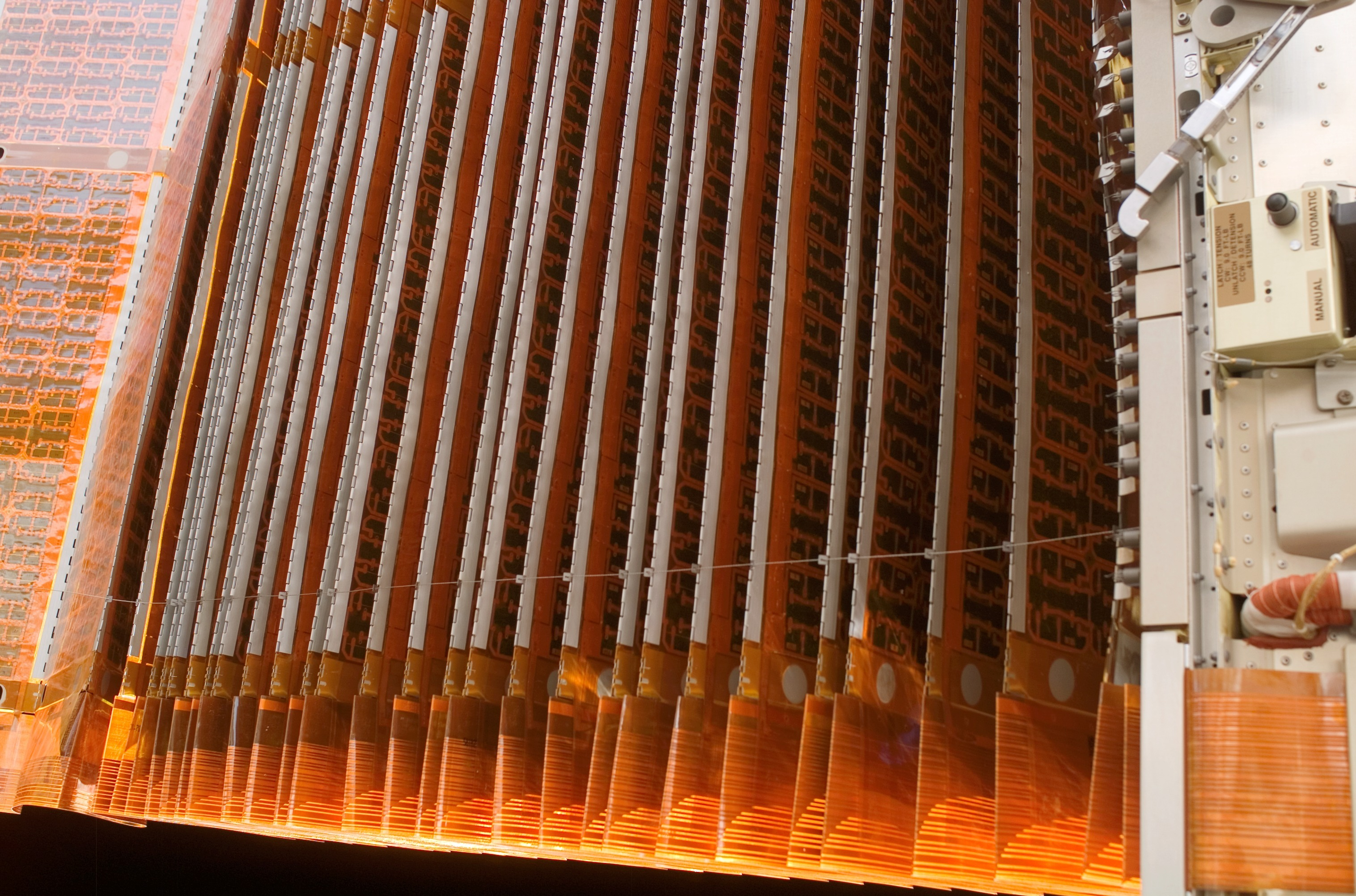
Close-up view of solar array folded like an accordion.

The International Space Station's main source of energy is from the four large U.S.-made photovoltaic arrays currently on the station, sometimes referred to as the Solar Array Wings (SAW). The first pair of arrays are attached to the P6 truss segment, which was launched and installed on top of Z1 in late 2000 during STS-97. The P6 segment was relocated to its final position, bolted to the P5 truss segment, in November 2007 during STS-120. The second pair of arrays was launched and installed in September 2006 during STS-115, but they did not provide electricity until STS-116 in December 2006 when the station got an electrical rewiring. The third pair of arrays was installed during STS-117 in June 2007. A final pair arrived in March 2009 on STS-119. More solar power was to have been available via the Russian-built Science Power Platform, but it was canceled.

Each of the Solar Array Wings are 34 m (112 ft) long by 12 m (39 ft) wide, have roughly 1,100 kg (2,400 lb) of mass, and are capable of generating nearly 30 kW of DC power. They are split into two photovoltaic blankets, with the deployment mast in between. Each blanket has 16,400 silicon photovoltaic cells, each cell measuring 8 cm x 8 cm, grouped into 82 active panels, each consisting of 200 cells, with 4,100 diodes.

Each pair of blankets was folded like an accordion for compact delivery to space. Once in orbit, the deployment mast between each pair of blankets unfolds the array to its full length. Gimbals, known as the Beta Gimbal Assembly (BGA) are used to rotate the arrays so that they face the Sun to provide maximum power to the International Space Station.

Over time, the photovoltaic cells on the wings have degraded gradually, having been designed for a 15-year service life. This is especially noticeable with the first arrays to launch, with the P6 and P4 Trusses in 2000 and 2006. To augment the P6 truss' wings, in June 2021 and November 2022, NASA launched four of a scaled-up version of the Roll Out Solar Array, in two pairs, aboard the SpaceX Dragon 2 missions SpaceX CRS-22, -26 and -28. These arrays are more lightweight and generate more energy than the existing arrays. They are intended to be deployed along the central part of the wings up to two thirds of their length. Work to install support brackets for the new arrays on the P6 truss mast cans was initiated by the members of Expedition 64. Work to install and deploy the first two arrays themselves on the P6 brackets was successfully conducted over three spacewalks by Shane Kimbrough and Thomas Pesquet of Expedition 65. In November and December 2022, astronauts Francisco Rubio and Josh A. Cassada of Expedition 68 installed the second set of brackets and arrays, one each on the P4 and S4 Trusses. In June 2023, astronauts Stephen Bowen and Warren Hoburg of Expedition 69 installed the third set of brackets and arrays, one each on the S6 and S4 Trusses. The last pair of iROSAs, the seventh and eighth, were launched aboard SpaceX CRS-35 and installed on the 2A and 3B power channels on the P4 and S6 truss segments in October and November 2026, by Expedition 75 astronauts Anil Menon and Joshua Kutryk.

=== Solar alpha rotary joint ===
The Alpha joint is the main rotary joint allowing the solar arrays to track the sun; in nominal operation the alpha joint rotates by 360° each orbit (however, see also Night Glider mode). One Solar Alpha Rotary Joint (SARJ) is located between the P3 and P4 truss segments and the other is located between the S3 and S4 truss segments. When in operation, these joints continuously rotate to keep the solar array wings on the outboard truss segments oriented towards the Sun. Each SARJ is 10 feet in diameter, weighs approximately 2,500 pounds and can be rotated continuously using bearing assemblies and a servo control system. On both the port and starboard sides, all of the power flows through the Utility Transfer Assembly (UTA) in the SARJ. Roll ring assemblies allow transmission of data and power across the rotating interface so it never has to unwind. The SARJ was designed, built, and tested by Lockheed Martin and its subcontractors.

The Solar Alpha Rotary Joints contain Drive Lock Assemblies which allow the outer segments of the ITS to rotate and track the Sun. A component of the DLA is a pinion which engages with the race ring that serves as a bull gear. There are two race rings and two DLAs in each SARJ providing on-orbit redundancy, however a series of space walks would be required to reposition the DLAs and the Trundle Bearing Assemblies (TBAs) to utilize the alternate race ring. A spare DLA was brought to the ISS on STS-122.

In 2007, a problem was detected in the starboard SARJ and in one of the two beta gimbal assemblies (BGA). Damage had occurred due to excessive and premature wear of a track in the joint mechanism. The SARJ was frozen during problem diagnosis, and in 2008 lubrication was applied to the track to address the issue.

=== Power conditioning and storage ===
The sequential shunt unit (SSU) is designed to coarsely regulate the solar power collected during periods of insolation—when the arrays collect power during sun-pointing periods. A sequence of 82 separate strings, or power lines, leads from the solar array to the SSU. Shunting, or controlling, the output of each string regulates the amount of power transferred. The regulated voltage setpoint is controlled by a computer located on the IEA and is normally set to around 140 volts. The SSU has an overvoltage protection feature to maintain the output voltage below 200 V DC maximum for all operating conditions. This power is then passed through the BMRRM to the DCSU located in the IEA. The SSU measures 32 by 20 by 12 inches (81 by 51 by 30 cm) and weighs 185 pounds (84 kg).

Each battery assembly, situated on the S4, P4, S6, and P6 Trusses, consists of 24 lightweight lithium-ion battery cells and associated electrical and mechanical equipment. Each battery assembly has a nameplate capacity of 110 Ah (396,000 C) (originally 81 Ah) and 4 kWh (14 MJ). This power is fed to the ISS via the BCDU and DCSU respectively.

The batteries ensure that the station is never without power to sustain life-support systems and experiments. During the sunlight part of the orbit, the batteries are recharged. The nickel-hydrogen batteries had a design life of 6.5 years which means that they were replaced multiple times during the expected 30-year life of the station. The batteries and the battery charge/discharge units are manufactured by Space Systems/Loral (SS/L), under contract to Boeing. Ni-H2 batteries on the P6 truss were replaced in 2009 and 2010 with more Ni-H2 batteries brought by Space Shuttle missions. The nickel-hydrogen batteries had a design life of 6.5 years and could exceed 38,000 charge/discharge cycles at 35% depth of discharge. Each battery measured 40 by 36 by 18 inches (102 by 91 by 46 cm) and weighed 375 pounds (170 kg).

From 2017 to 2021, the nickel-hydrogen batteries were replaced by lithium-ion batteries. On January 6, 2017, Expedition 50 members Shane Kimbrough and Peggy Whitson began the process of converting some of the oldest batteries on the ISS to the new lithium-ion batteries. Expedition 64 members Victor Glover and Michael S. Hopkins concluded the campaign on February 1, 2021. There is a number of differences between the two battery technologies. One difference is that the lithium-ion batteries can handle twice the charge, so only half as many lithium-ion batteries were needed during replacement. Also, the lithium-ion batteries are smaller than the older nickel-hydrogen batteries. Although Li-ion batteries typically have shorter lifetimes than Ni-H2 batteries as they cannot sustain as many charge/discharge cycles before suffering notable degradation, the ISS Li-ion batteries have been designed for 60,000 cycles and ten years of lifetime, much longer than the original Ni-H2 batteries' design life span of 6.5 years.

=== Mobile Base System ===
The Mobile Base System (MBS) is a platform (mounted on the Mobile Transporter) for the robotic arms Canadarm2 and Dextre carrying them 108 metres down rails between the S3 and P3 truss. Beyond the rails Canadarm2 can step over the alpha rotary joint and relocate to grapple fixtures on the S6 and P6 truss. During STS-120 Astronaut Scott Parazynski rode the Orbiter Boom Sensor to repair a tear in the 4B solar array.

== Truss assembly sequence ==
The first truss segment to be launched was Z1, which was mounted to the Unity module's zenith (facing away from Earth) Common Berthing Mechanism. It was followed by P6, which was mounted atop (zenith side) the Z1 truss. Next, the S0 truss was mounted atop the Destiny module. The other truss elements were attached sequentially to either side of S0. As the truss neared completion, the P6 truss was relocated from Z1 to the end of P5.

Element	Flight	Launch date	Length (m)	Diameter (m)	Mass (kg)
Z1	3A—STS-92	October 11, 2000	4.6	4.2	8,755
P6	4A—STS-97	November 30, 2000	18.3	10.7	15,824
S0	8A—STS-110	April 8, 2002	13.4	4.6	13,971
S1	9A—STS-112	October 7, 2002	13.7	4.6	14,124
P1	11A—STS-113	November 23, 2002	13.7	4.6	14,003
P3/P4	12A—STS-115	September 9, 2006	13.7	4.8	15,824
P5	12A.1—STS-116	December 9, 2006	3.37	4.55	1,864
S3/S4	13A—STS-117	June 8, 2007	13.7	10.7	15,824
S5	13A.1—STS-118	August 8, 2007	3.37	4.55	1,818
P6 (relocation)	10A—STS-120	October 23, 2007	18.3	10.7	15,824
S6	15A—STS-119	March 15, 2009	13.7	10.7	15,824

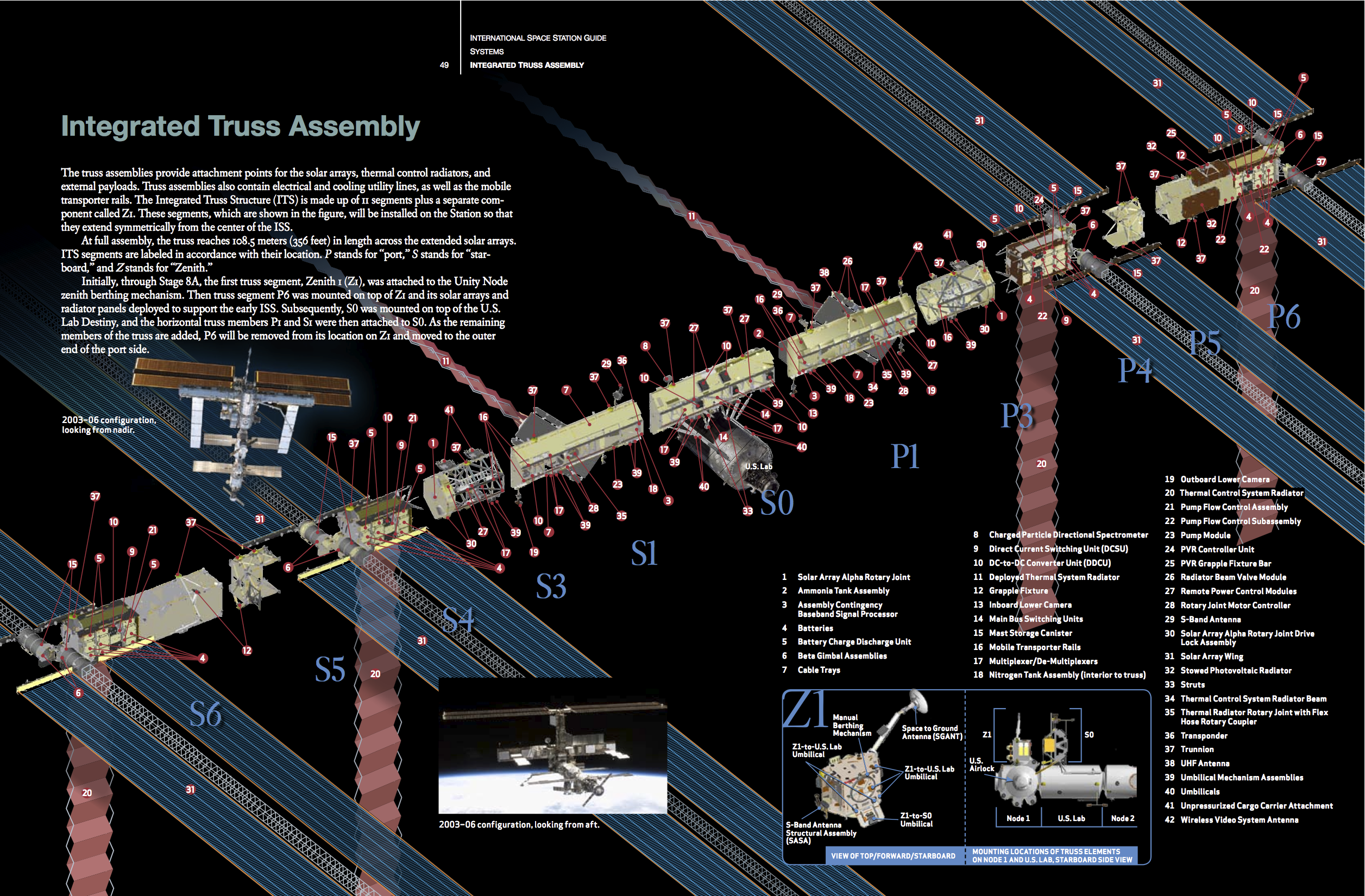
ISS Truss Components

== Technical schematics ==
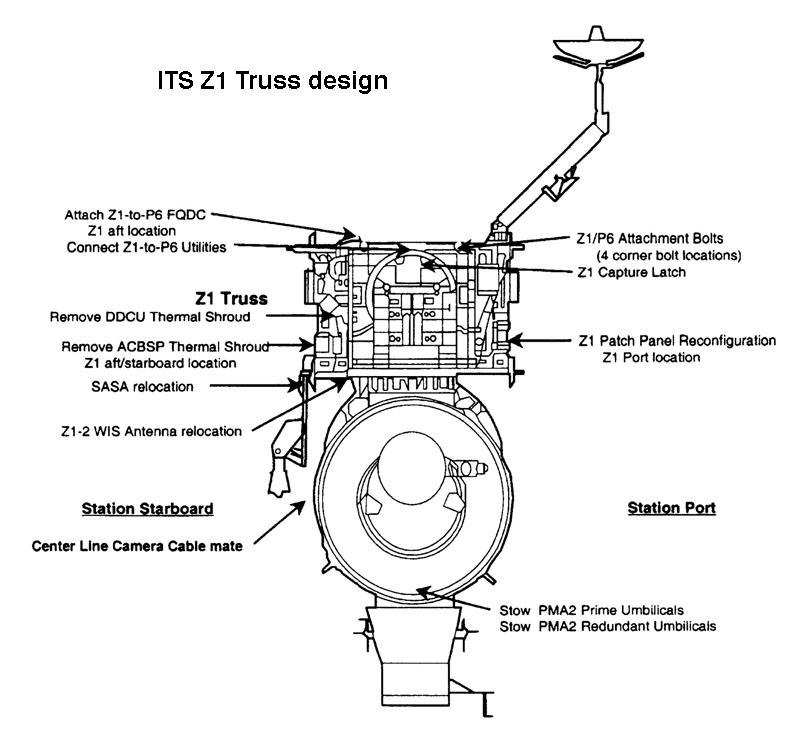
Z1 Truss design

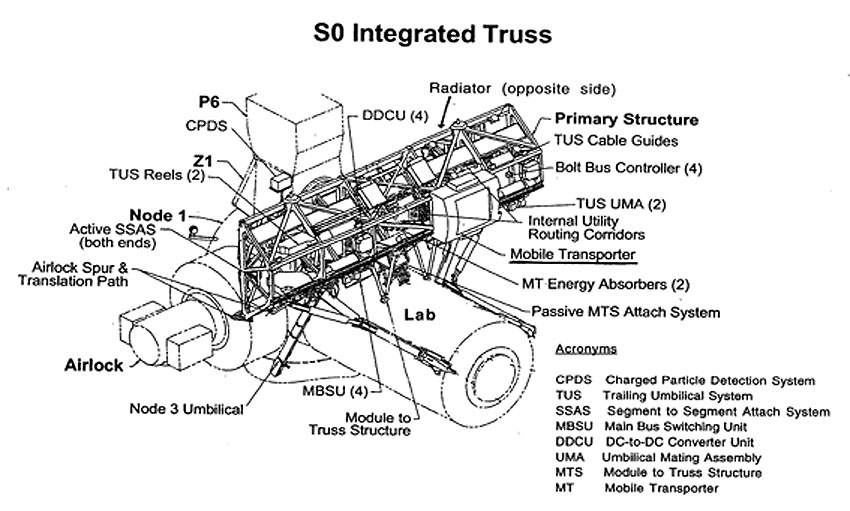
S0 Truss design

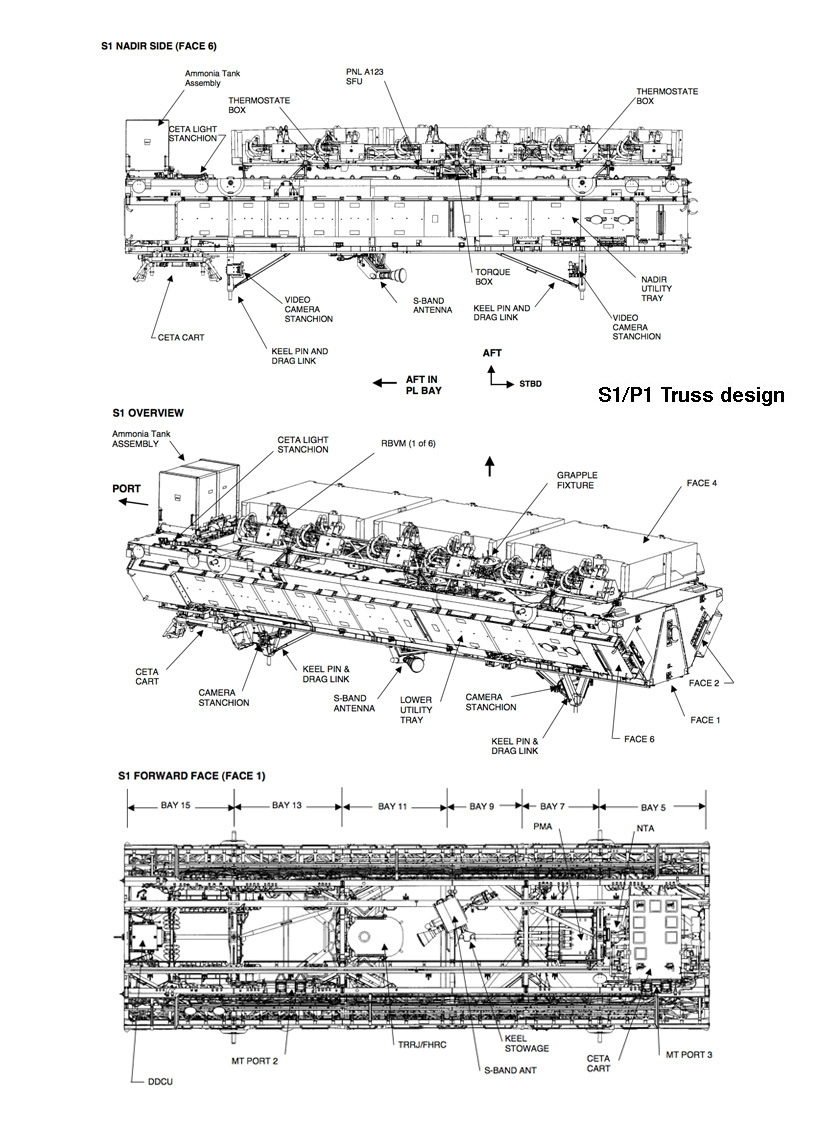
P1 / S1 Truss design

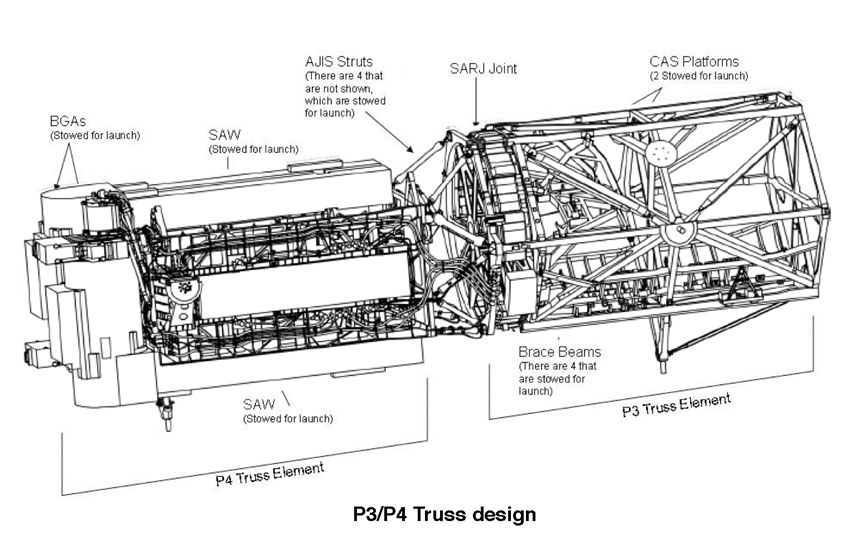
P3/4 / S3/4 Truss design

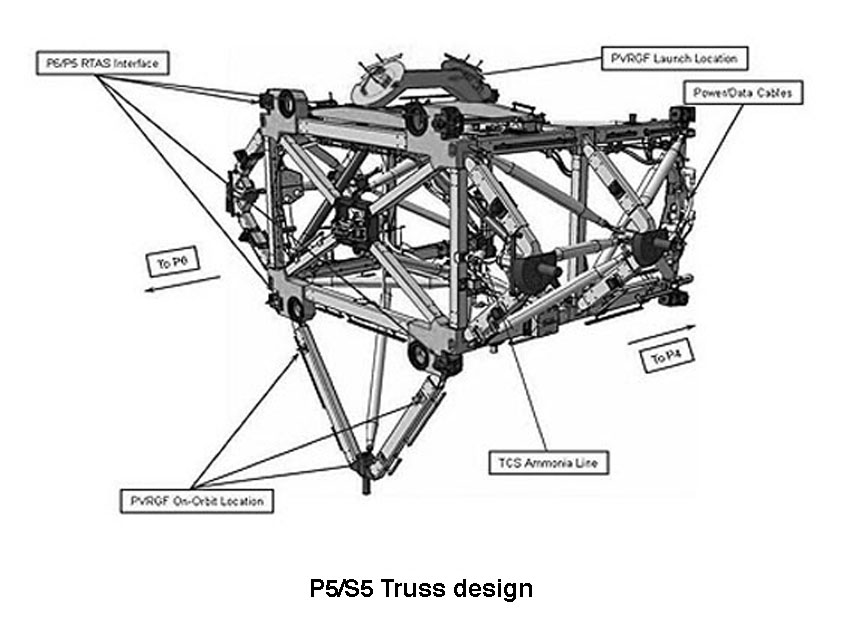
P5 / S5 Truss design

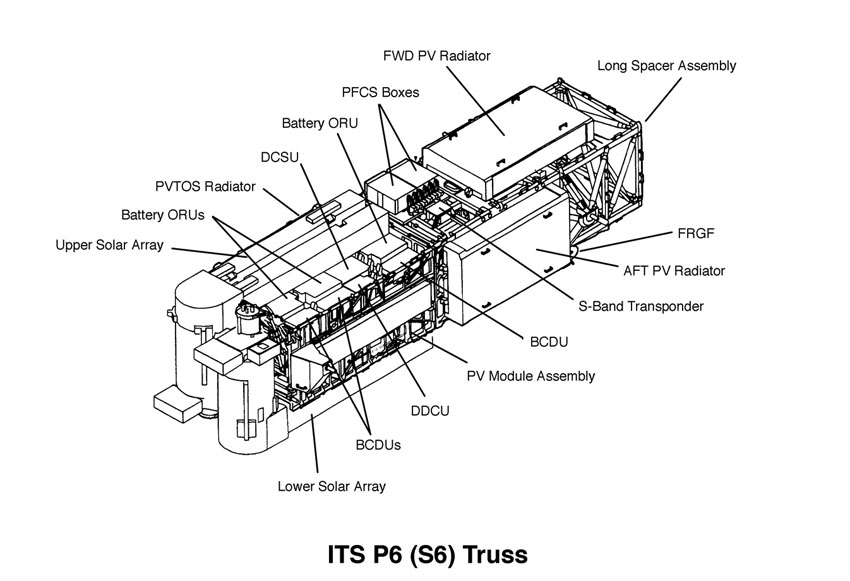
P6 / S6 Truss design

== See also ==
- Science Power Platform – Cancelled ISS module
- Manufacturing of the International Space Station – Fabrication of the ISS elements
- Assembly of the International Space Station – Process of assembling the International Space Station
- List of International Space Station expeditions – Long-duration missions to the orbital lab
