= Plasma contactor =

Spacecraft electrostatic charge eliminator

Plasma contactors are devices used on spacecraft in order to prevent accumulation of electrostatic charge through the expulsion of plasma (often Xenon).

An electrical contactor is an electrically controlled switch which closes a power or high voltage electrical circuit. A plasma contactor changes the electrically insulating vacuum into a conductor by providing movable electrons and positive gas ions. This conductive path closes a phantom loop circuit to discharge or neutralize the static electricity that can build up on a spacecraft.

Space contains regions with varying concentrations of charged particles such as the plasma sheet, and a static charge builds up as the spacecraft moves between these regions, or as the electrical potential varies within such a region.

Static electricity may also build up on a spacecraft as a result of space radiation, including sunlight, depending on the materials used on the surfaces of the spacecraft.

A plasma contactor is mounted on the Z1 segment of the International Space Station Integrated Truss Structure.
