= Night Glider mode =

ISS Solar Array

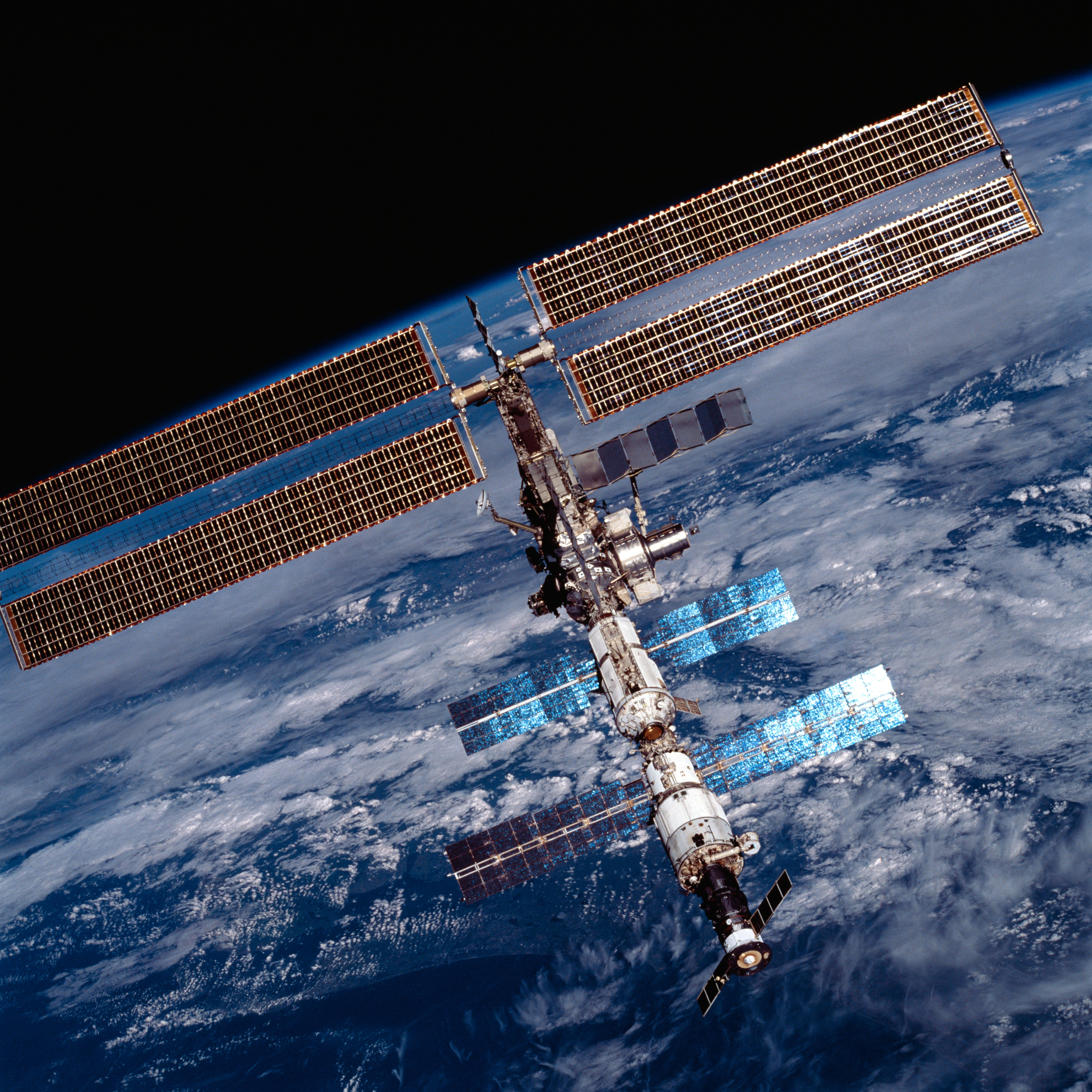
The ISS in 2001 showing solar panels.

Night Glider mode (or "XVV Night Glider mode") is one of the procedures for orienting the solar arrays on the International Space Station.

Normally the photovoltaic solar arrays of the space station track the sun. However, one of the main causes of orbital decay on the space station is that the area of the solar arrays, brushing against the thin residual atmosphere at orbital altitude, results in a small amount of aerodynamic drag. The drag can be lowered by orienting the solar arrays in "sun slicer" mode, where they fly edge-on to the orbital direction, rather than tracking the sun, however, this orientation reduces the power produced. The "night glider" mode is a hybrid orientation, where the solar arrays track the sun during the period when the space station is illuminated, are rotated edge-on to the orbital direction when it enters in the Earth's shadow, and then are returned to their tracking position when the station re-enters sunlight. This reduces the average drag on the station's solar arrays by about 30 percent, with no reduction in power.

Use of night-glider mode had been proposed at NASA Lewis early in the space station's history, but was only implemented in 2003, after the Space Shuttle Columbia disaster, when the ability of the Space Shuttle to bring propellant to the station for orbital maintenance was removed while the Space Shuttle program went through a period of redesign. The implementation of drag-reducing flight modes of the space station resulted in saving about 1,000 kg of orbital-maintenance propellant per year.

A different operational mode, sun slicer drag-reduction, is also sometimes used; in sun slicer mode, the arrays are oriented edge-on to the direction of travel for the full orbit. In this mode, the drag is minimized, however, the power output is reduced from the full power available. Operationally, it is sometimes desirable to orient the solar arrays to produce the opposite effect, and maximize the drag on the arrays. This may be done, for example, to reduce the space station orbital altitude in order to reduce the amount of fuel required for the shuttle to reach the space station. Choosing which solar array orientation mode is used is a function of ISS operations ("mission control").

== See also ==
- Electrical system of the International Space Station
