= STS-131 =

2010 American crewed spaceflight to the ISS

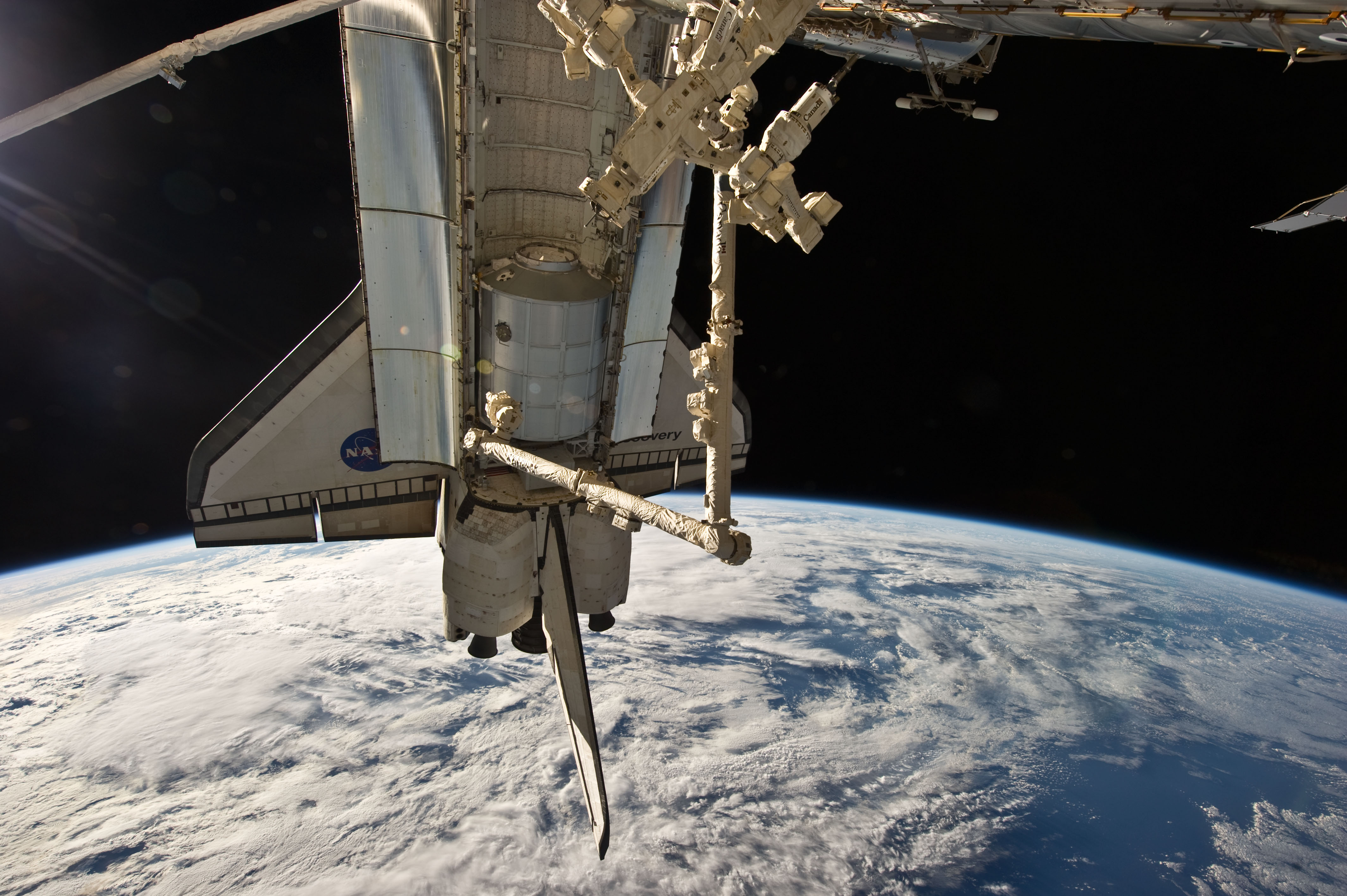
- Canadarm2 grapples the MPLM Leonardo in Discovery's payload bay, prior to berthing
- Mission type: ISS logistics
- Operator: NASA
- COSPAR ID: 2010-012A
- SATCAT no.: 36507
- Mission duration: 15 days, 2 hours, 47 minutes, 9 seconds
- Distance travelled: 10,029,810 kilometres (6,232,235 mi)
- Orbits completed: 238

Spacecraft properties
- Spacecraft: Space Shuttle Discovery
- Launch mass: 2,051,031 kilograms (4,521,749 lb)(total); 121,047 kilograms (266,864 lb) (orbiter)
- Landing mass: 102,039 kilograms (224,957 lb)

Crew
- Crew size: 7
- Members: Alan Poindexter; James P. Dutton; Richard A. Mastracchio; Dorothy Metcalf-Lindenburger; Stephanie Wilson; Naoko Yamazaki; Clayton Anderson

Start of mission
- Launch date: April 5, 2010, 10:21:22 UTC
- Launch site: Kennedy, LC-39A

End of mission
- Landing date: April 20, 2010, 13:08:35 UTC
- Landing site: Kennedy, SLF Runway 15

Orbital parameters
- Reference system: Geocentric
- Regime: Low Earth
- Perigee altitude: 320 kilometres (200 mi)
- Apogee altitude: 346 kilometres (215 mi)
- Inclination: 51.6°
- Period: 90 minutes

Docking with ISS
- Docking port: PMA-2 (Harmony forward)
- Docking date: April 7, 2010, 07:44 UTC
- Undocking date: April 17, 2010, 12:52 UTC
- Time docked: 10 days, 5 hours, 8 minutes
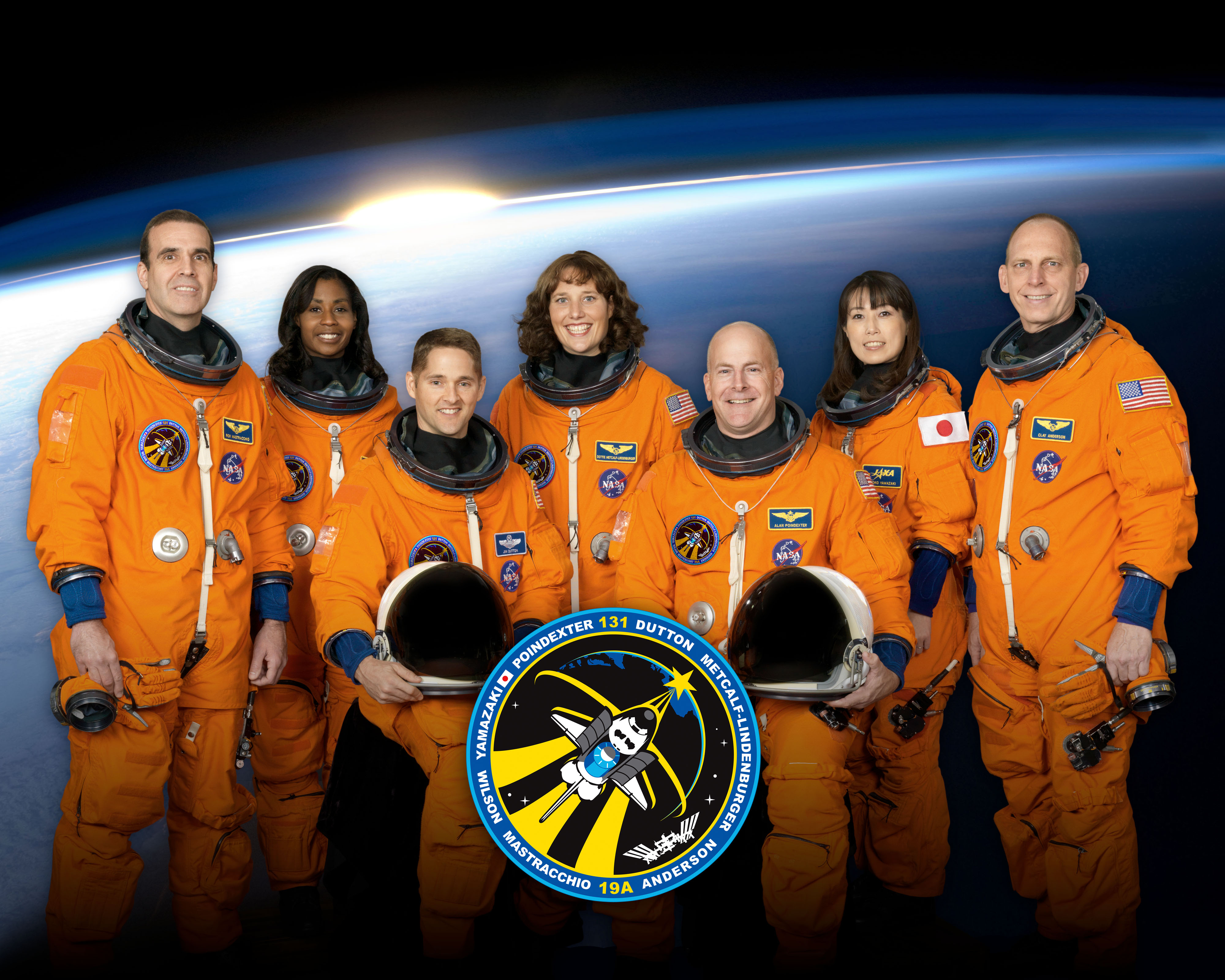
- Seated: James Dutton (left) Alan Poindexter (right), Standing (l-r): Rick Mastracchio, Stephanie Wilson, Dorothy Metcalf-Lindenburger, Naoko Yamazaki (JAXA) and Clayton Anderson Space Shuttle program

STS-131 (ISS assembly flight 19A) was a NASA Space Shuttle mission to the International Space Station (ISS). Space Shuttle Discovery launched on April 5, 2010, at 6:21 am from LC-39A, and landed at 9:08 am on April 20, 2010, on runway 33 at the Kennedy Space Center's Shuttle Landing Facility. The mission marked the longest flight for Space Shuttle Discovery and its 38th and penultimate flight.

The primary payload was a Multi-Purpose Logistics Module loaded with supplies and equipment for the International Space Station. The mission also removed and replaced an ammonia tank assembly outside the station on the S1 truss. STS-131 furthermore carried several on-board payloads; this mission had the most payloads since STS-107. It is also the last shuttle mission with a crew of 7.

== Crew ==
Position	Astronaut
Commander	(United States) Alan Poindexter; Second and last spaceflight
Pilot	(United States) James Dutton; Only spaceflight
Mission Specialist 1	(United States) Richard Mastracchio; Third spaceflight
Mission Specialist 2 Flight Engineer	(United States) Dorothy M. Metcalf-Lindenburger; Only spaceflight
Mission Specialist 3	(United States) Stephanie Wilson; Third spaceflight
Mission Specialist 4	(Japan) Naoko Yamazaki, JAXA; Only spaceflight
Mission Specialist 5	(United States) Clayton Anderson; Second and last spaceflight
Notes: This was the final Space Shuttle mission with a seven person crew.; It was the final Space Shuttle crew with any "rookie" astronauts; all of the remaining missions would have all-veteran crews.; The launch was the last shuttle mission to take place at night.; STS-131 was the third and last mission in the Space Shuttle program with three female astronauts. STS-40 and STS-96 were the first two.; STS-131 marked the first time two Japanese astronauts, Naoko Yamazaki from the shuttle crew and Soichi Noguchi on the ISS, were in space together.; Expedition 23 Flight Engineer Tracy Caldwell Dyson was on the ISS at the time. This made STS-131 the first time four women have been in space at once.; Naoko Yamazaki was the last Japanese astronaut to fly on the Space Shuttle.

=== Crew seat assignments ===
Seat	Launch	Landing	Seats 1–4 are on the flight deck. Seats 5–7 are on the mid-deck.
1	Poindexter		Seats 1–4 are on the flight deck. Seats 5–7 are on the mid-deck.
2	Dutton		Seats 1–4 are on the flight deck. Seats 5–7 are on the mid-deck.
3	Mastracchio	Anderson	Seats 1–4 are on the flight deck. Seats 5–7 are on the mid-deck.
4	Metcalf-Lindenburger		Seats 1–4 are on the flight deck. Seats 5–7 are on the mid-deck.
5	Wilson		Seats 1–4 are on the flight deck. Seats 5–7 are on the mid-deck.
6	Yamazaki		Seats 1–4 are on the flight deck. Seats 5–7 are on the mid-deck.
7	Anderson	Mastracchio	Seats 1–4 are on the flight deck. Seats 5–7 are on the mid-deck.

== Mission payload ==
=== Multi-Purpose Logistics Module Leonardo ===
The primary payload of STS-131 was the Multi-Purpose Logistics Module (MPLM) Leonardo. The MPLM was filled with food and science supplies for the International Space Station (ISS). The MPLM also carried the third and final Minus Eighty Degree Laboratory Freezer for ISS (MELFI), Window Orbital Research Facility (WORF), one Crew Quarters Rack, the Muscle Atrophy Resistive Exercise (MARES) rack, Resupply Stowage Racks (RSRs), and Resupply Stowage Platforms (RSPs).

=== Lightweight Multi-Purpose Equipment Support Structure Carrier ===
The Lightweight Multi-Purpose Equipment Support Structure Carrier (LMC) carried a refurbished Ammonia Tank Assembly (ATA) to the ISS. The refurbished ATA was removed from the Space Station and returned for use on this mission during STS-128. It was swapped with an empty tank which will ride home on the LMC.

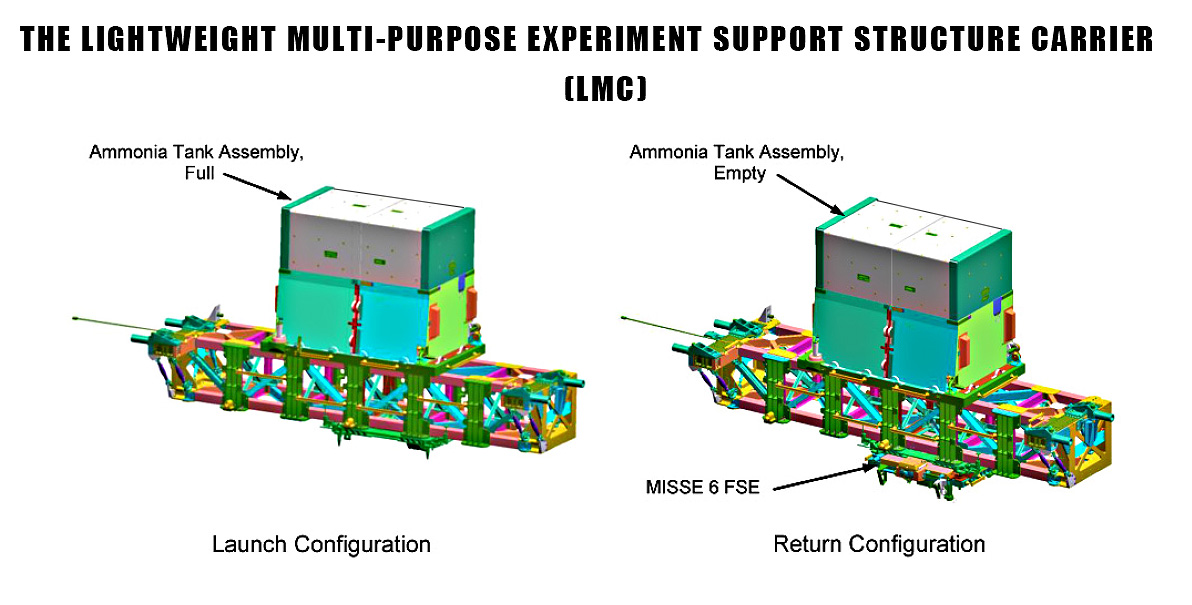
LMC with ATAs STS-131. Note that the MISSE-6 FSE return was deferred to STS-133.

Location	Cargo	Mass
Bays 1–2	Orbiter Docking System; EMU 3008 / EMU 3017	1,800 kilograms (4,000 lb); ~260 kilograms (570 lb)
Bay 4P	Shuttle Power; Distribution Unit (SPDU)	~18 kilograms (40 lb)
Bay 7S	ROEU 751A umbilical	127 kilograms (280 lb)
Bays 7–12	Leonardo (MPLM FM-1)	12,371 kilograms (27,273 lb)
Bay 13	Lightweight MPESS Carrier (LMC)	1,764 kilograms (3,889 lb)
Starboard Sill	Orbiter Boom Sensor System	382 kilograms (842 lb)
Port Sill	Canadarm	410 kilograms (900 lb)
	Total:	15,332 kilograms (33,801 lb)

=== TriDAR ===
This mission was the second flight of the TriDAR, a 3D dual-sensing laser camera, intended for potential use as an autonomous rendezvous and docking sensor. TriDAR provides guidance information that can be used to guide a vehicle during rendezvous and docking operations in space. TriDAR does not rely on any reference markers, such as reflectors, positioned on the target spacecraft. To achieve this, it relies on a laser based 3D sensor and a thermal imager. Geometric information contained in successive 3D images is matched against the known shape of the target object to calculate its position and orientation in real-time. The TriDAR tracked the ISS position and orientation from the shuttle during docking, undocking, and flyaround operations.

== Mission milestones ==
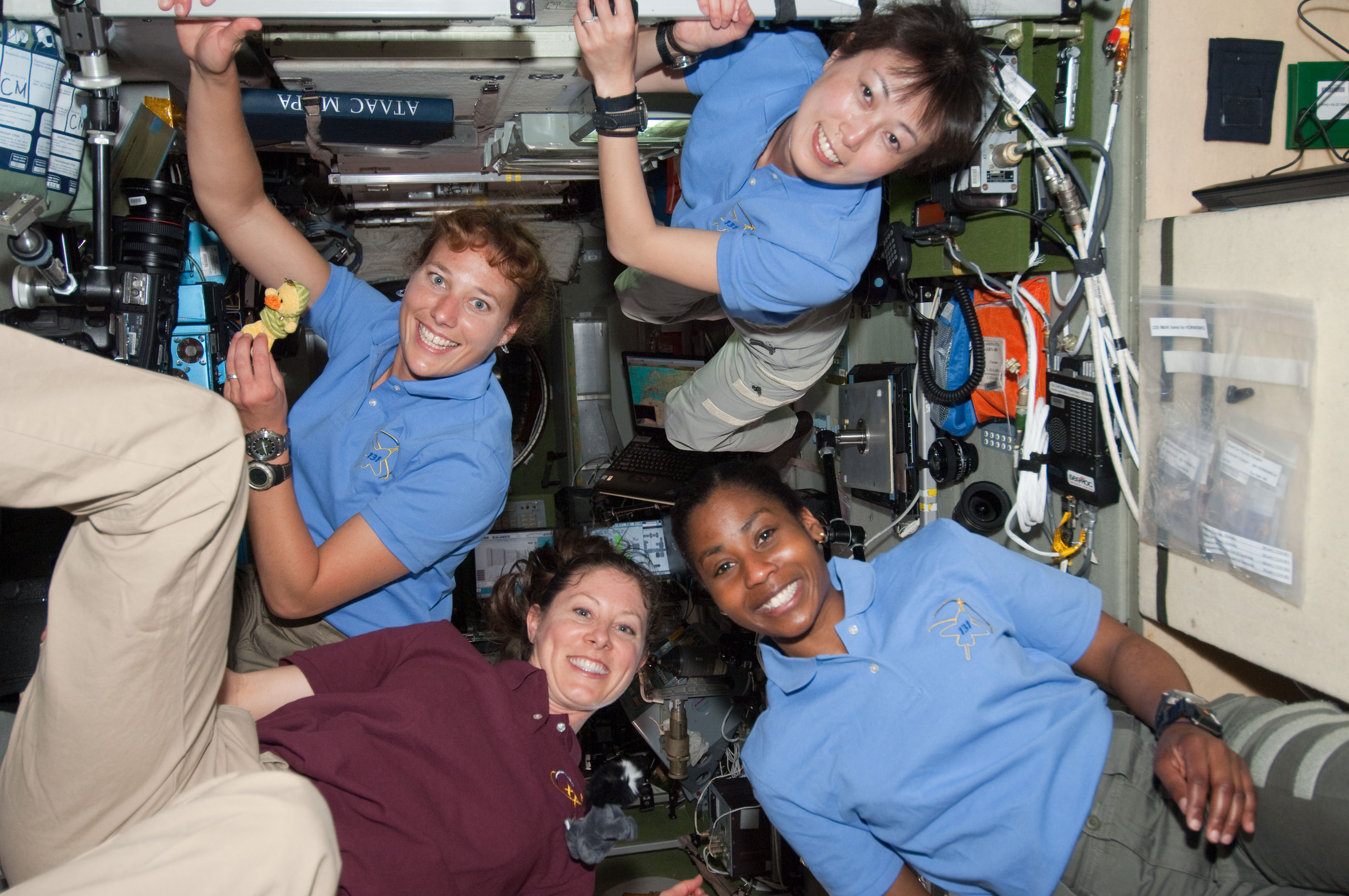
The first time four women were in space at the same time.

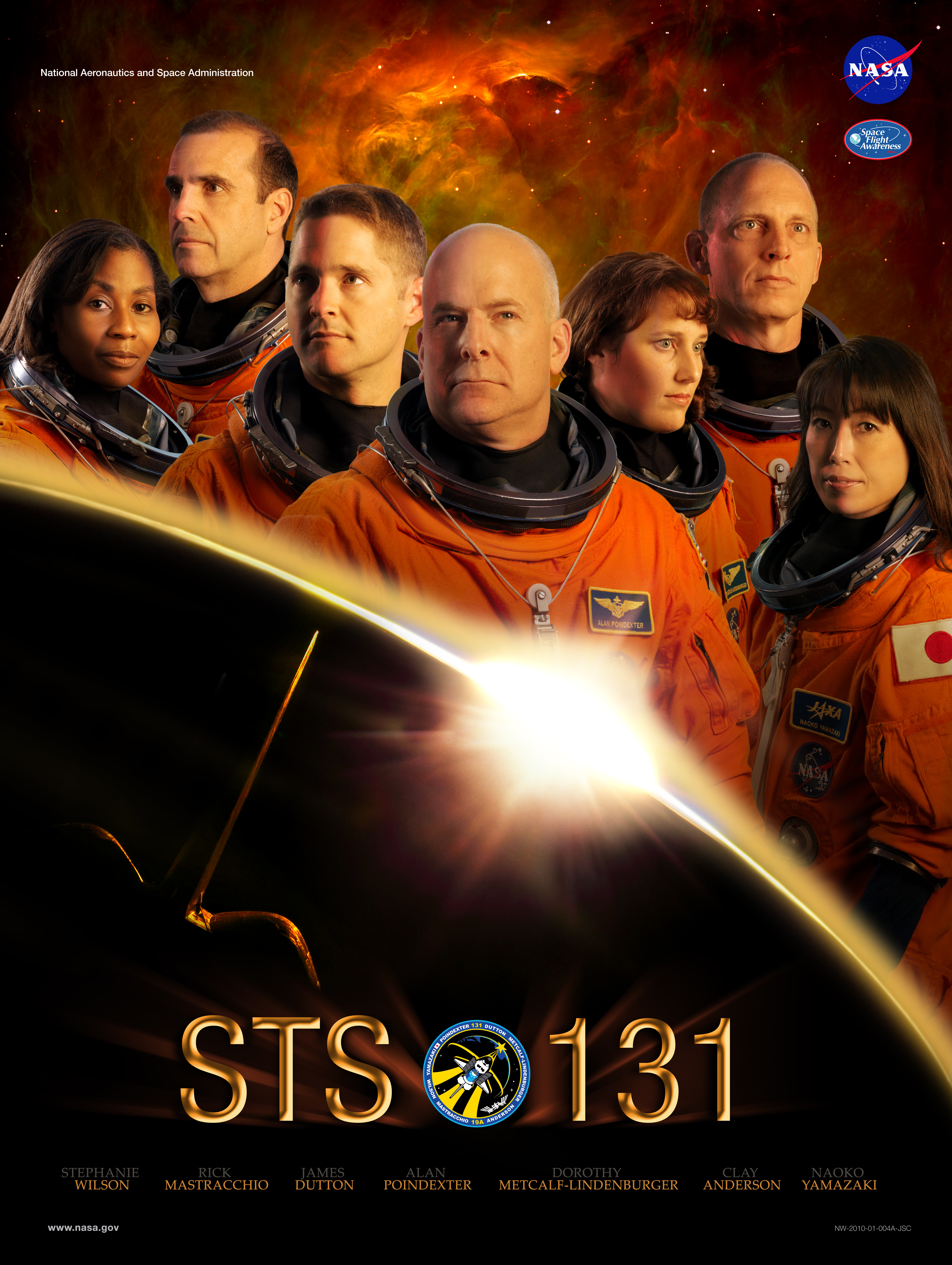
Mission poster, designed in the Armageddon theme

The mission marked:

- 162nd NASA crewed space flight
- 131st shuttle mission since STS-1
- 38th flight of Discovery
- 33rd shuttle mission to the ISS
- 106th post-Challenger mission
- 18th post-Columbia mission
- 35th and last night launch of a shuttle, 22nd night launch from launch pad 39A
- 2nd "descending node" entry since 2003

== Shuttle processing ==
Space Shuttle Discovery was moved from its hangar in the Orbiter Processing Facility (OPF) 3 to the nearby Vehicle Assembly Building (VAB) on February 22, 2010. The rollover was completed around 10:30 EST. According to NASA, the rollover occurred a day earlier than announced to take advantage of favorable weather in advance of poor conditions forecasted on the next day.

An earlier plan to move Discovery into the VAB on February 12, 2010, was delayed because of cold weather at the Kennedy Space Center. For the rollover, temperatures in the VAB had to be above 45 °F (7 °C) for more than twelve hours because Discovery was not attached to any heating purges to protect its systems from potential damage from the cold.

Space Shuttle Discovery began its trip, known as the rollout, to LC-39A at 23:58 EST on March 2, 2010. The complete shuttle stack and mobile launcher platform were secured to the LC-39A structure at 6:49 EST on March 3, 2010. The 3.4 mi (5.5 km) trek took 6 hours 51 minutes to complete. The rollout was delayed 24 hours by the threat of lightning from a passing cold front. That weather moved away, and the stiff wind gusts blowing on Florida's Space Coast on the next day were not a factor for the rollout. Ahead of the rollout, engineers noticed some damage caused by birds to the External Tank (ET-135), which was repaired inside the VAB. Birds had managed to reach the tank, and pecked away at the Thermal Protection System (TPS) foam.

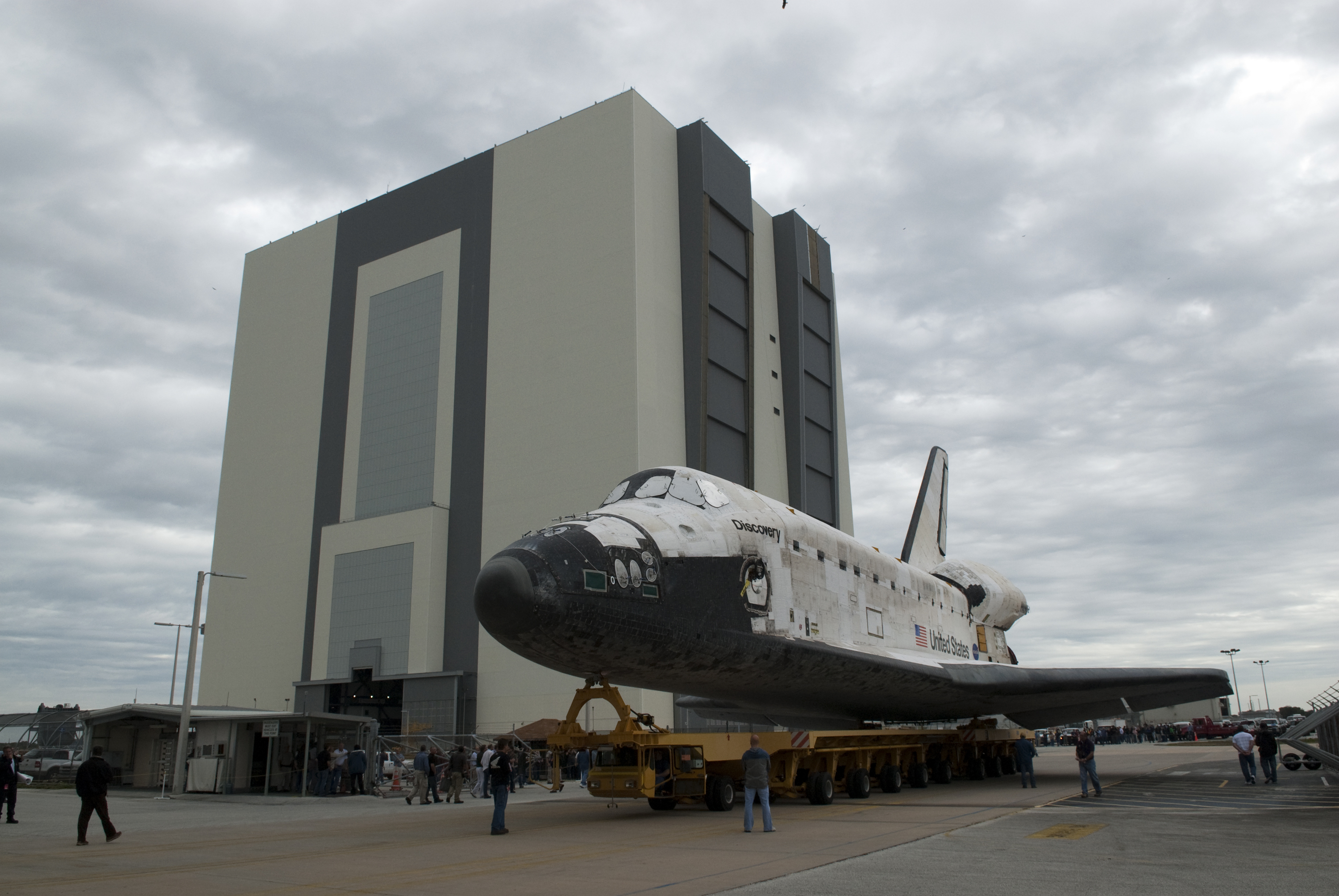
Space Shuttle Discovery rolls toward the Vehicle Assembly Building.

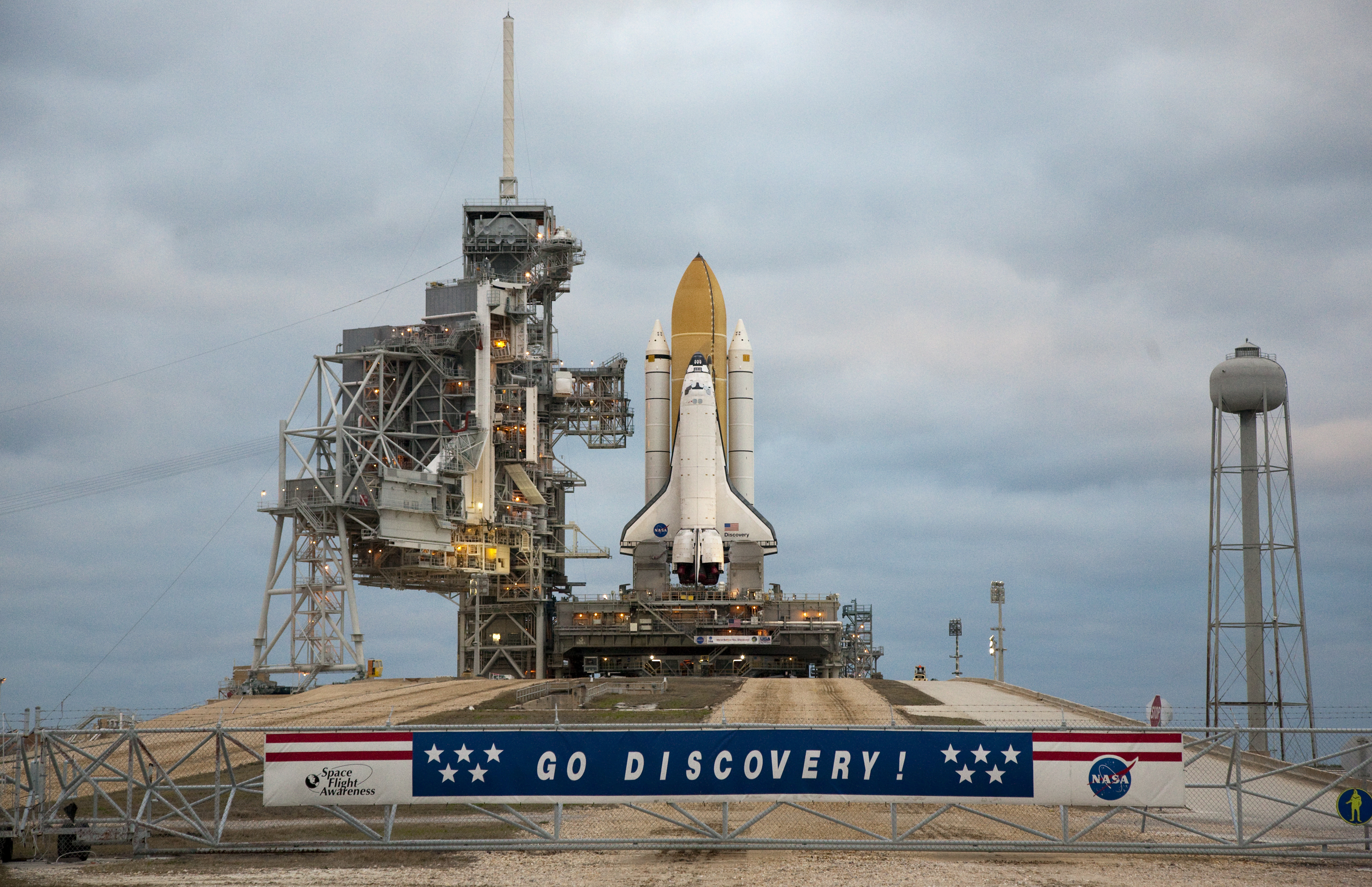
Space Shuttle Discovery at Launch Pad 39A.

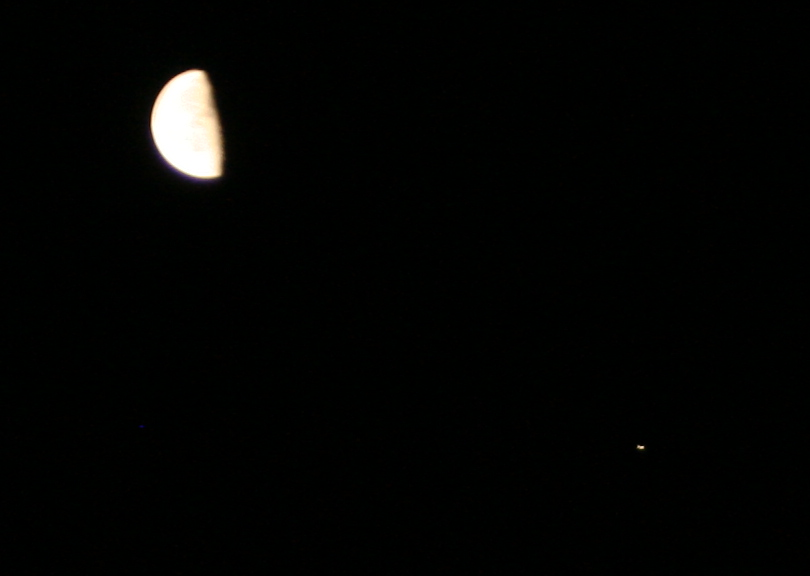
International Space Station (bottom right) passes over the Cape 15 minutes prior to launch.

== Mission timeline ==
=== April 5 (Flight Day 1 – Launch) ===
Discovery lifted off successfully at 06:21 EDT, marking this launch as the last night launch in the Space Shuttle program. After the 8 1/2-minute ride to space, Discovery's seven person crew began configuring the orbiter from a launch vehicle to an orbital vehicle. Commander Alan Poindexter and pilot Jim Dutton, with help from mission specialist 2 Dorothy Metcalf-Lindenburger, also performed a series of engine firings or burns to adjust their speed and refine their path to the International Space Station. While the engine burns were going on, the rest of the crew opened the payload bay doors, set up the computers and K_{u} band antenna. The antenna suffered a failure during normal checkout and setup on orbit. Due to the failure, the normal downlink of imagery of the external tank was not completed. The crew on board will monitor the inspections of the thermal protection system (TPS) in real time and will note any spots of interest and let the ground know while downlinking the imagery after docking. The dish antenna also serves as a radar antenna, measuring the distance to the space station.

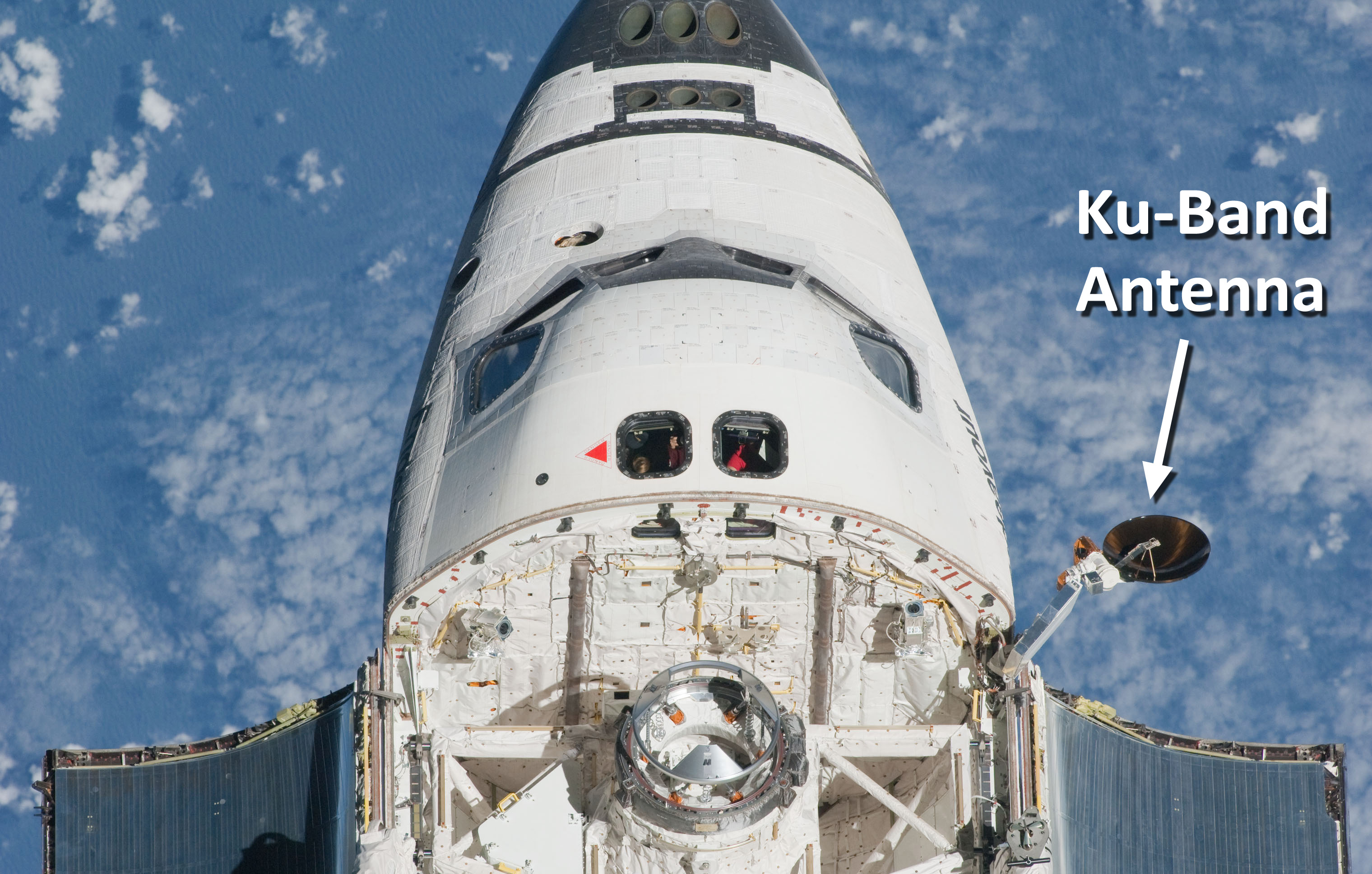
The failed K_{u} band dish antenna

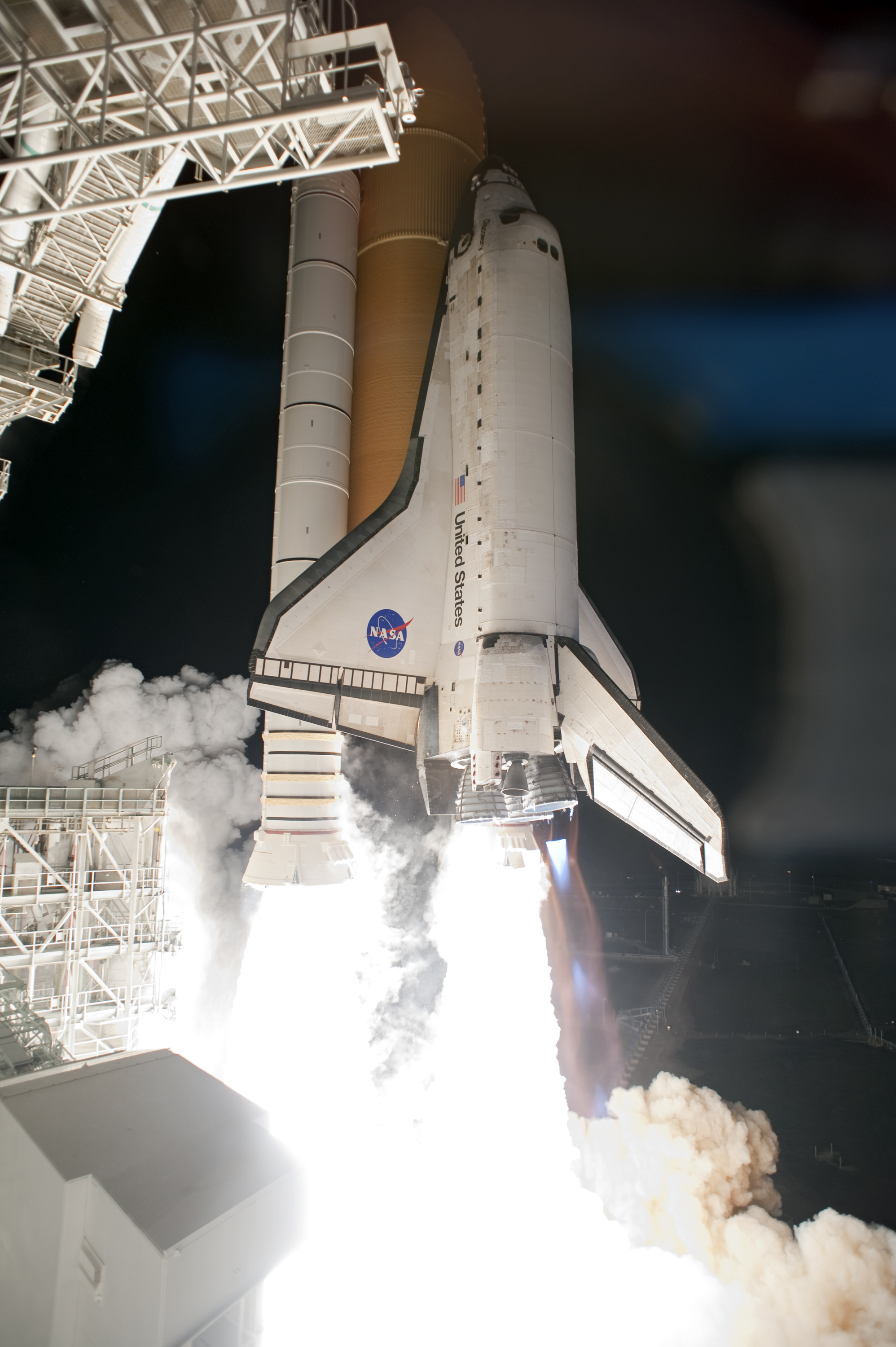
Discovery lifts off Launch Pad 39A

Launch video (9 min 55 secs)

=== April 6 (Flight Day 2 – Inspections) ===
The seven person crew of STS-131 was awakened to begin their first full day in space on Flight Day 2. Due to the lack of K_{u}-band communication, changes to the crews daily plan were read up for them to write out. After their post sleep activities, commander Alan Poindexter and pilot Jim Dutton fired Discovery's Orbital Maneuvering System (OMS) engines to correct and further refine the shuttle's path to the ISS. Astronauts Naoko Yamazaki and Dorothy Metcalf-Lindenburger began activating and checking out the Shuttle Remote Manipulator System (SRMS) also known as the Canadarm. While Metcalf-Lindenburger and Yamazaki were working with Canadarm, Stephanie Wilson was getting equipment together and set up to record the inspections of the shuttle's heat shield. The inspections were recorded so they could be downlinked to the ground once docked to the ISS. Once all that work was done, commander Poindexter and pilot Dutton joined Metcalf-Lindenburger, Yamazaki, and Wilson to conduct the inspection of the shuttle's heat shield. While the inspection was going on, Rick Mastracchio and Clayton Anderson were on the mid-deck of Discovery checking out the Extravehicular Mobility Units (EMU) and getting them ready for their three spacewalks. The last portion of the crew day was spent preparing and checking out all of the tools used during rendezvous.

=== April 7 (Flight Day 3 – Docking) ===
Space Shuttle Discovery successfully docked with the space station at 07:44 UTC (03:44 EDT) on April 7, 2010, as the two spacecraft sailed 220 miles above the Caribbean. The crew performed six successful engine firings to set up the on-time docking. Prior to docking commander Poindexter guided Discovery through the standard Rendezvous Pitch Maneuver (RPM). Station commander Oleg Kotov and flight engineer T.J. Creamer took more than 350 photos of Discovery's heat shield. Once Discovery docked to the International Space Station (ISS), a series of leak checks were done on both sides of the hatch by the shuttle and station crews. The hatches between the two vehicles were opened at 09:11 UTC (05:11 EDT), which was 30 minutes earlier than planned. Once the hatches were opened the STS-131 crew got a safety briefing from the station crew, then began to transfer items that would be needed for later in the day and early on flight day 4. Two items that were transferred were the two EMUs that will be used for the three spacewalks. The crew also completed a grapple of the Orbiter Boom Sensor System (OBSS) with the Space Station Remote Manipulator System (SSRMS) also known as Canadarm2. Once the OBSS was grappled it was unberthed from the starboard sill of the space shuttle payload bay, and handed off to the SRMS. Throughout the day, after docking to the station, the shuttle crew began downlinking all of the inspection video from flight day 2, and launch imagery and video.

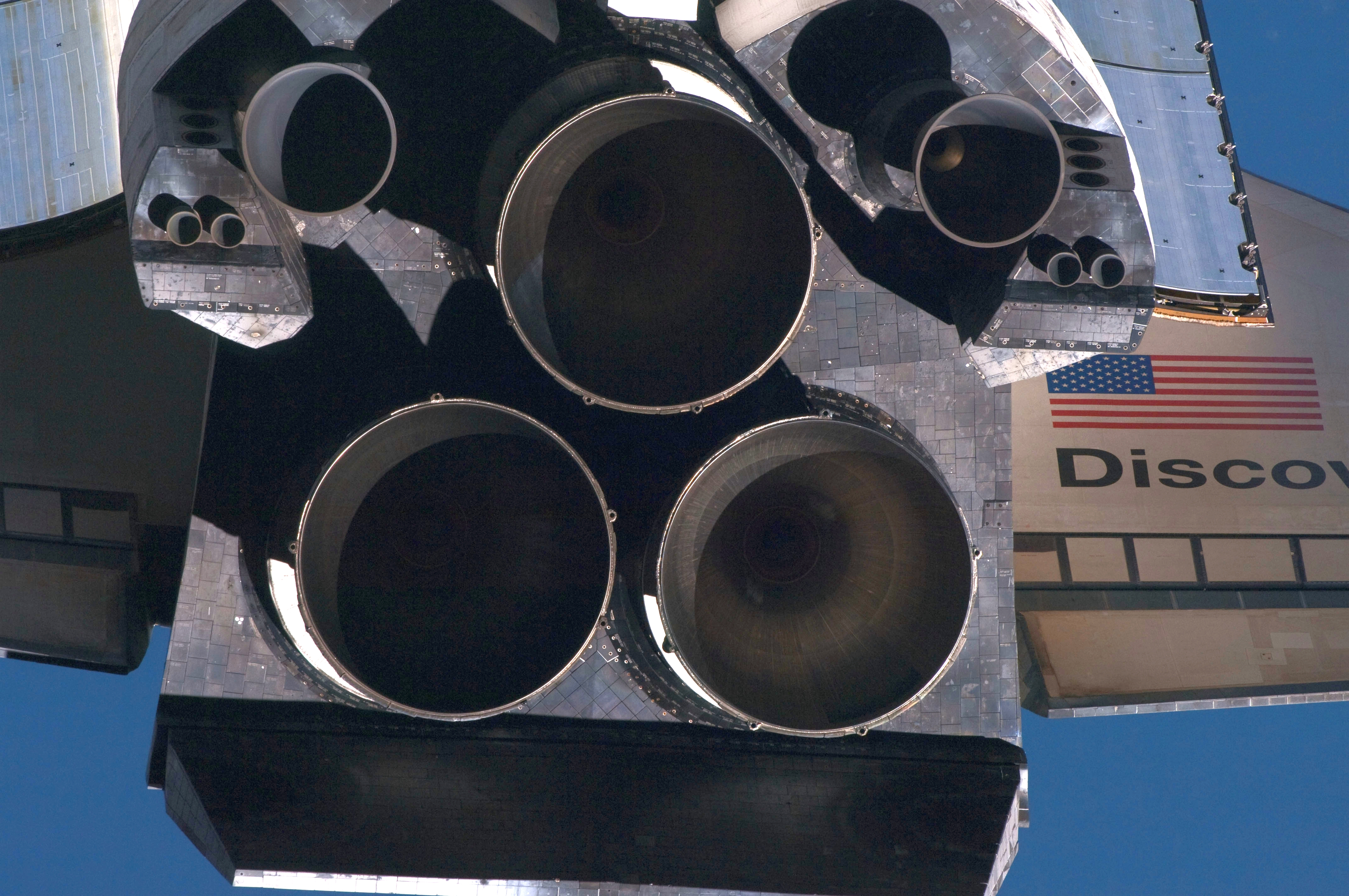
Aft portion of Discovery, including the three main engines, during the RPM.

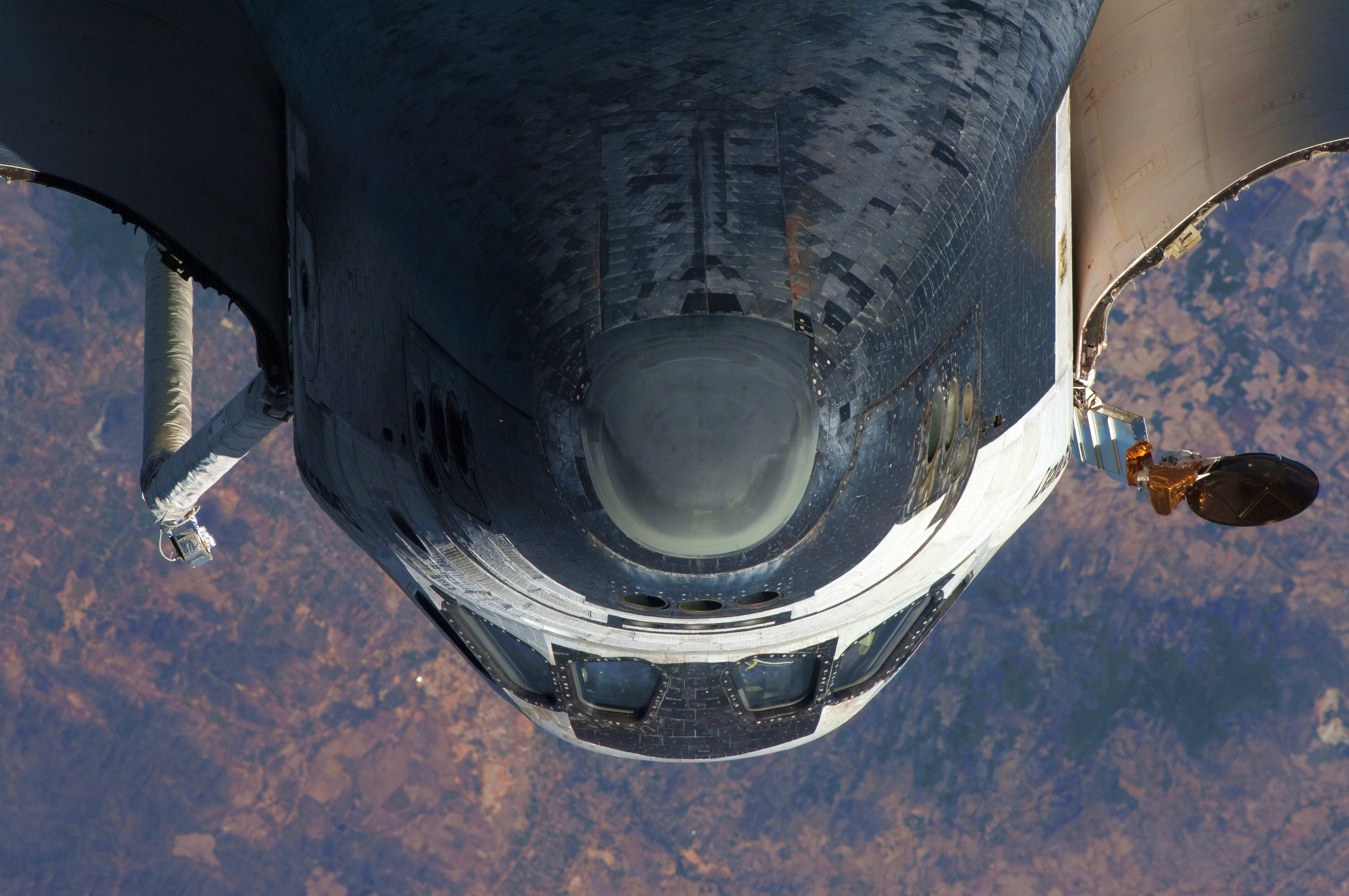
View of the underside of the crew cabin of Discovery during the RPM.

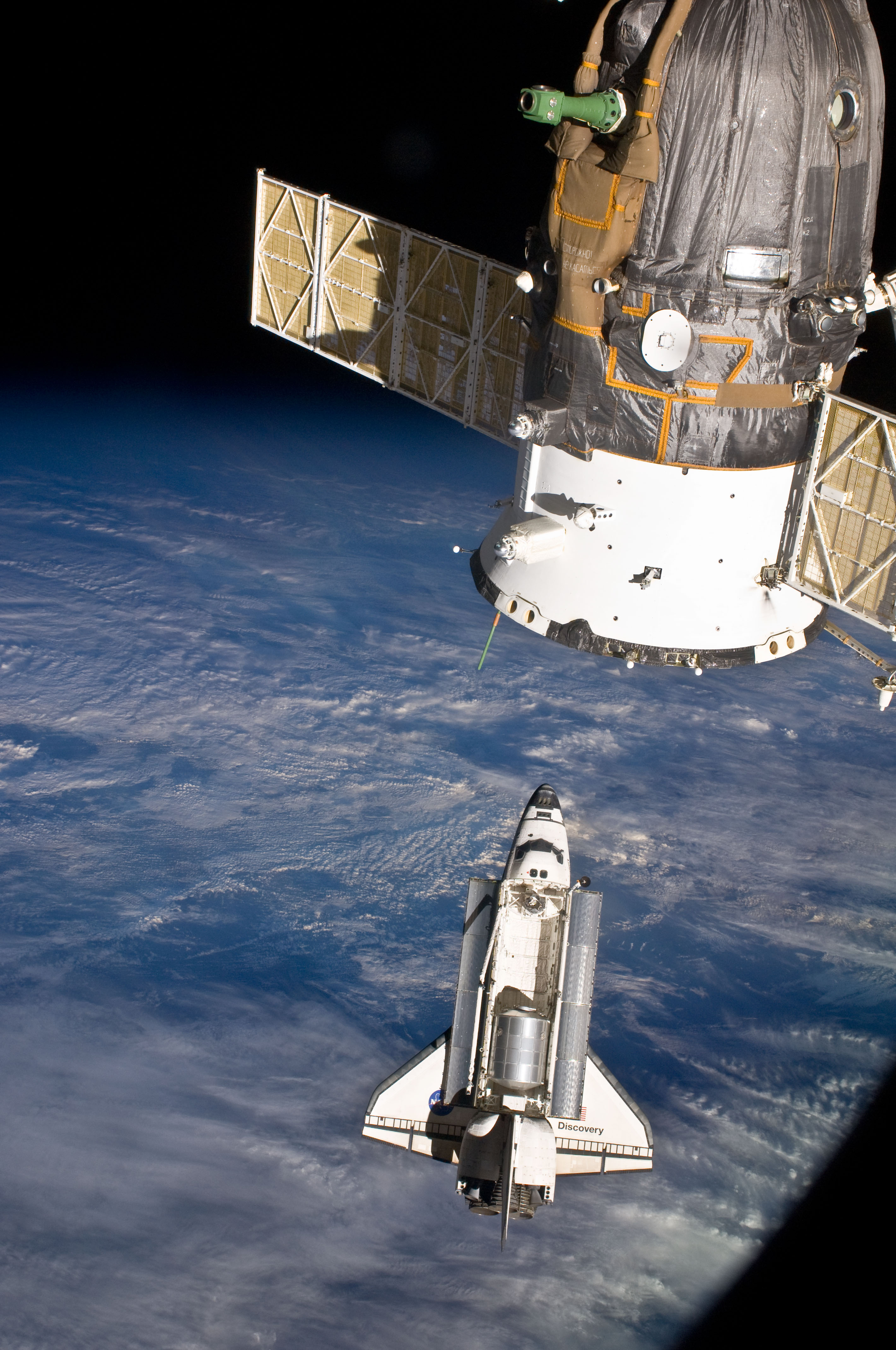
Discovery approaches the Space Station for docking.

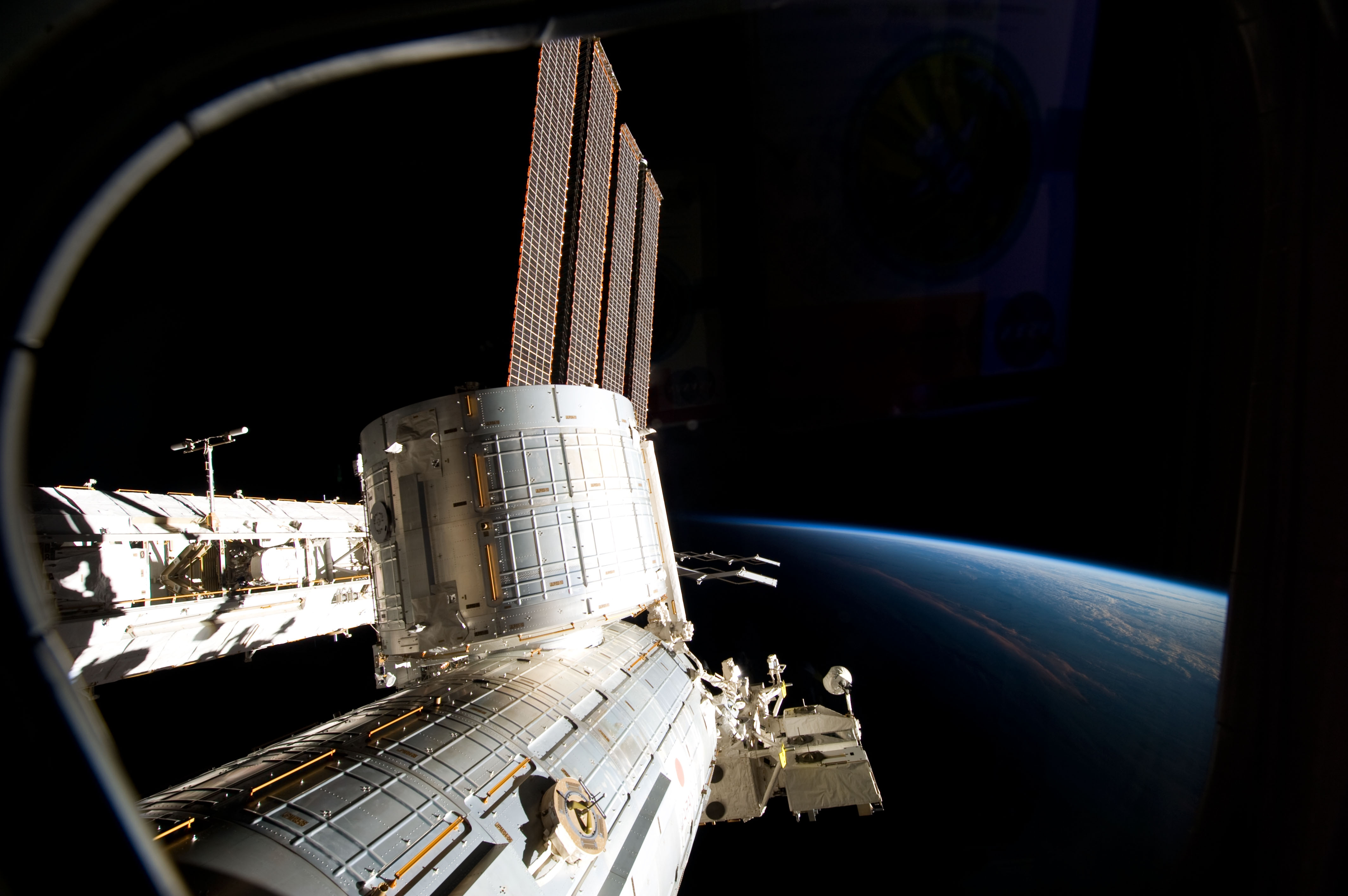
Kibo, photographed by a crew member while Discovery was docked with the station.

=== April 8 (Flight Day 4 – MPLM ingress) ===
On flight day 4, Stephanie Wilson and Naoko Yamazaki grappled and berthed the Multi-purpose Logistics Module (MPLM) Leonardo. The MPLM was berthed to the station at 04:24 UTC (00:24 EDT). The hatches were opened by station flight engineer Soichi Noguchi and shuttle mission specialist Clayton Anderson at 11:58 UTC (07:58 EDT). The joint STS-131/Expedition 23 crews began transferring cargo from the MPLM, with the first item being a Rate Gyro Assembly (RGA) which will be replaced on the first spacewalk of the mission. During flight day 4, commander Alan Poindexter did several in-flight interviews. Commander Poindexter was joined by mission specialists Rick Mastracchio and Stephanie Wilson. The interviews were with the Tom Joyner Radio Show, WVIT-TV and Fox News Radio. At the end of the day, Mastracchio and Anderson entered the Quest airlock and begin breathing pure oxygen for an hour, while the atmospheric pressure inside the airlock was lowered to 10.2 psi. This procedure is known as the pre-breathe protocol and is done before every spacewalk, to purge nitrogen from the blood stream and prevent decompression sickness.

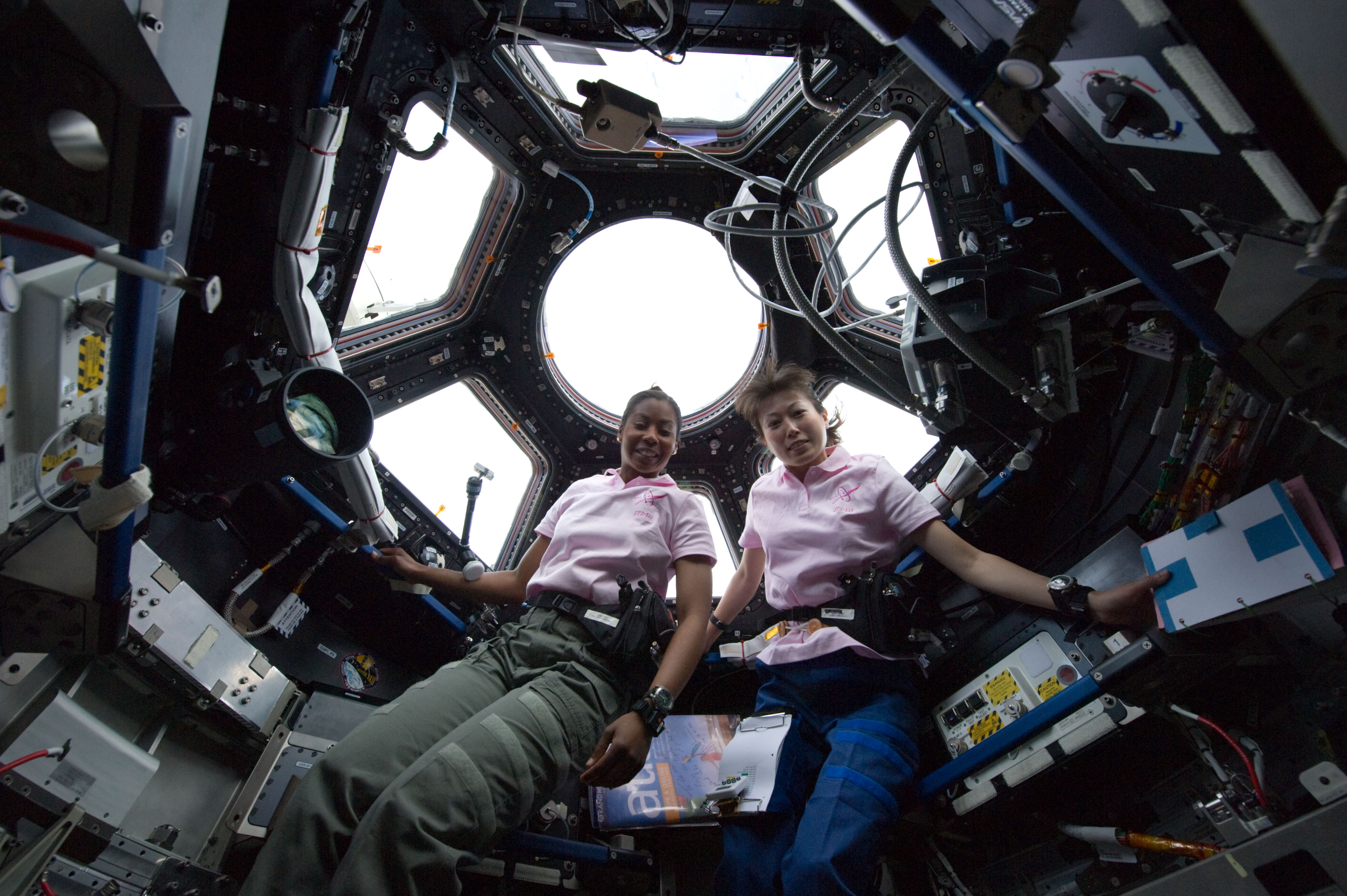
Stephanie Wilson and Naoko Yamazaki in the Cupola.

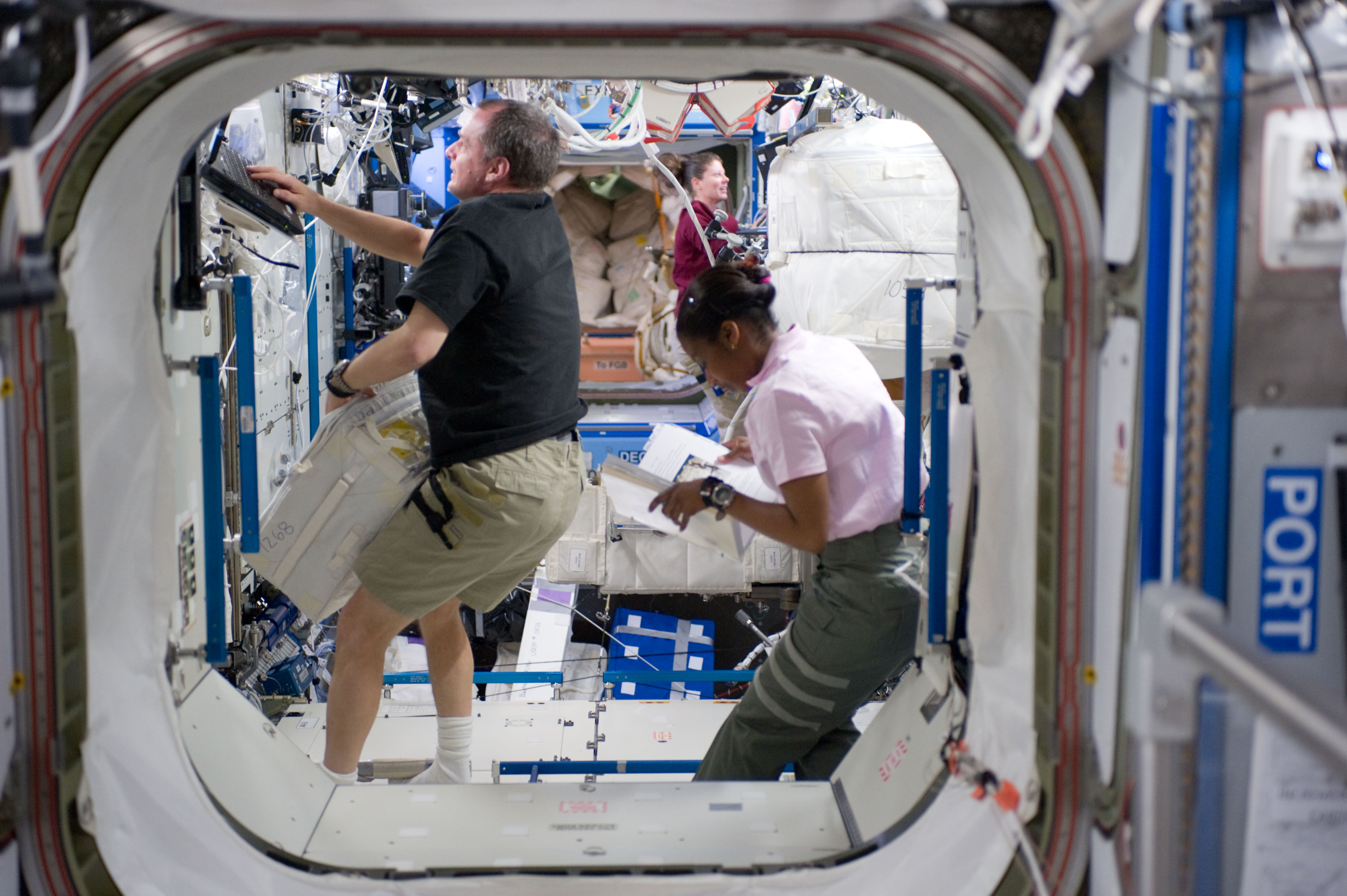
Wilson in the US lab

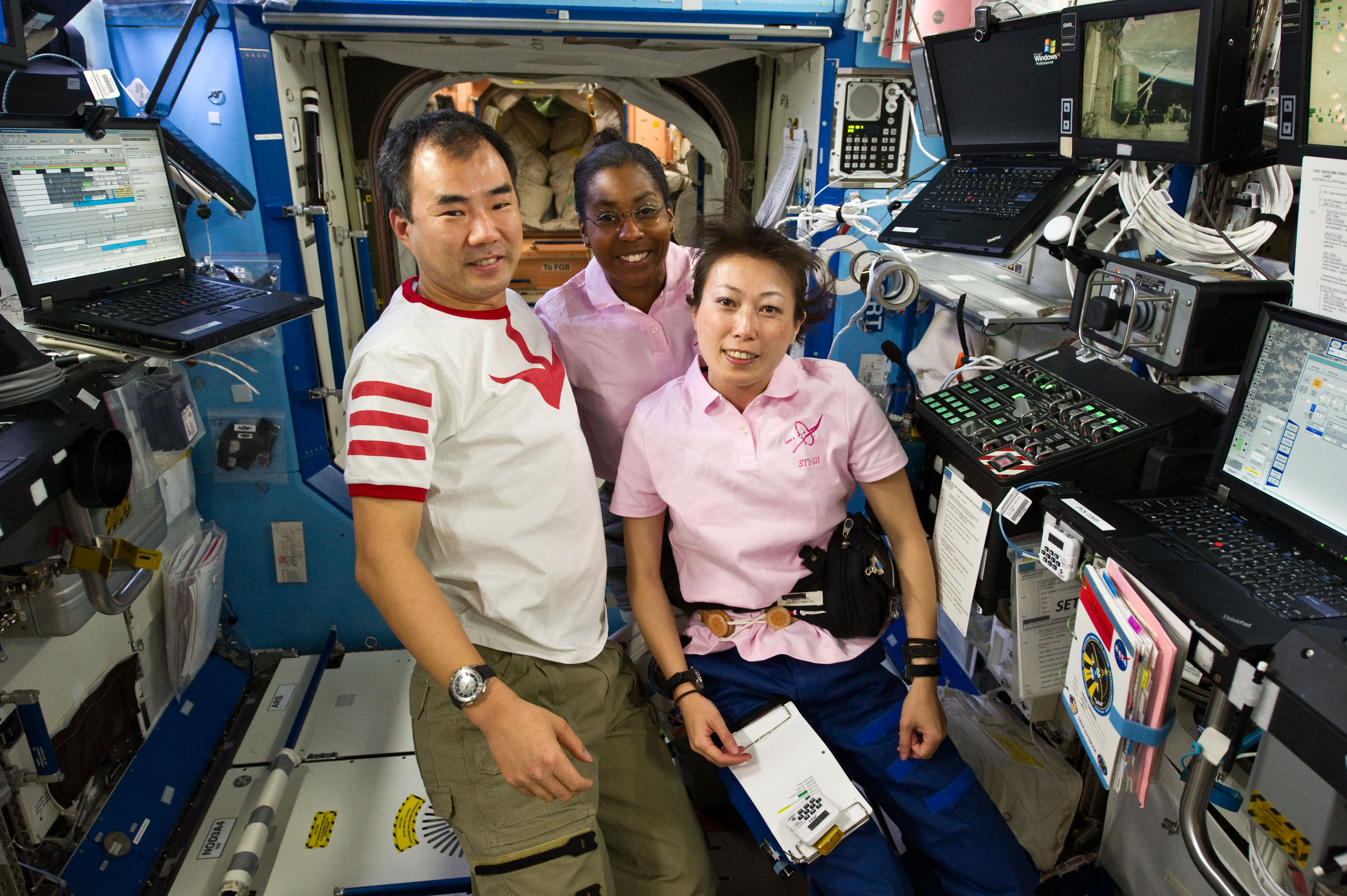
Robotic workstation

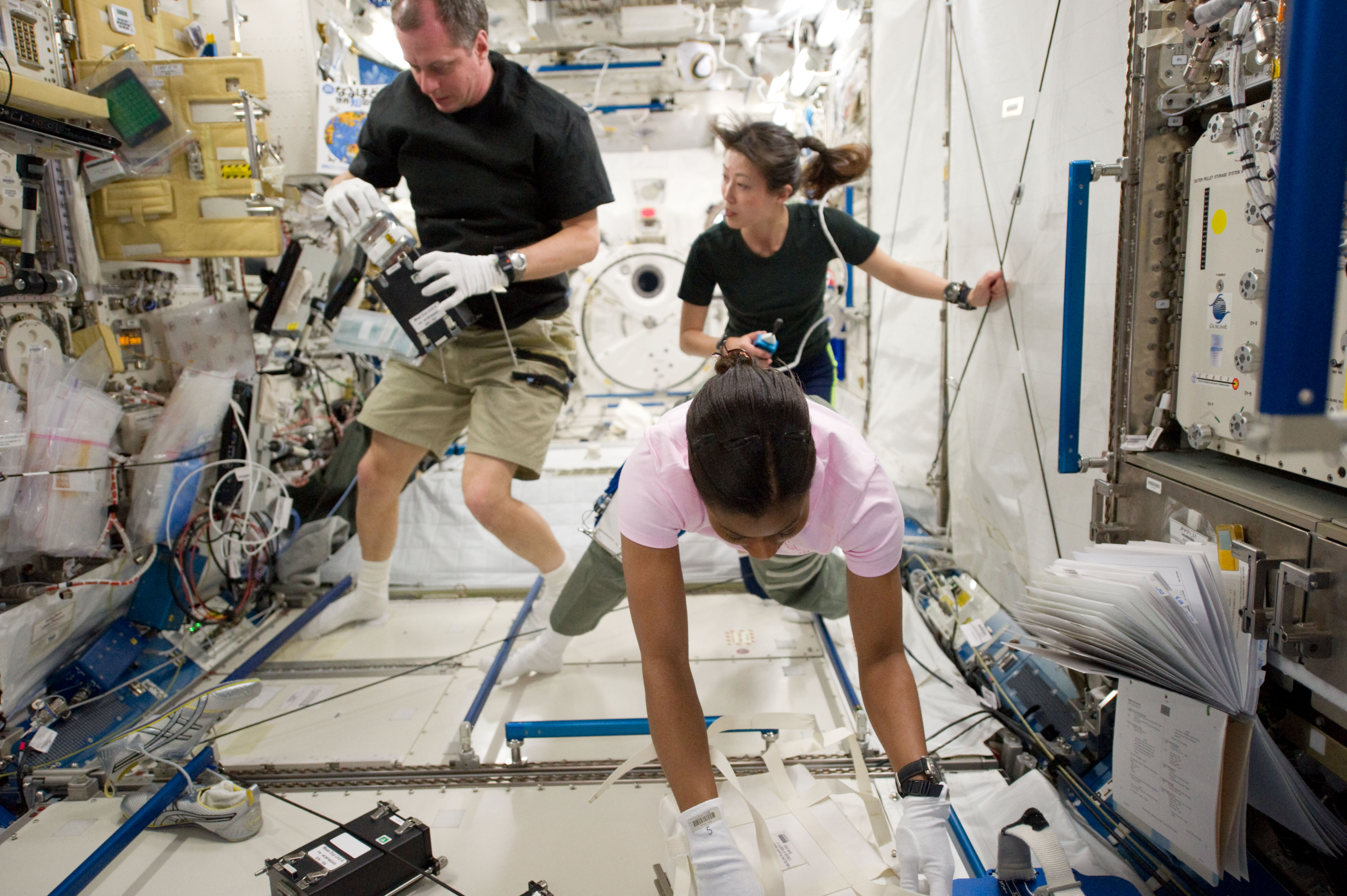
The crew sorting out blueprints in the Japanese Experiment Module

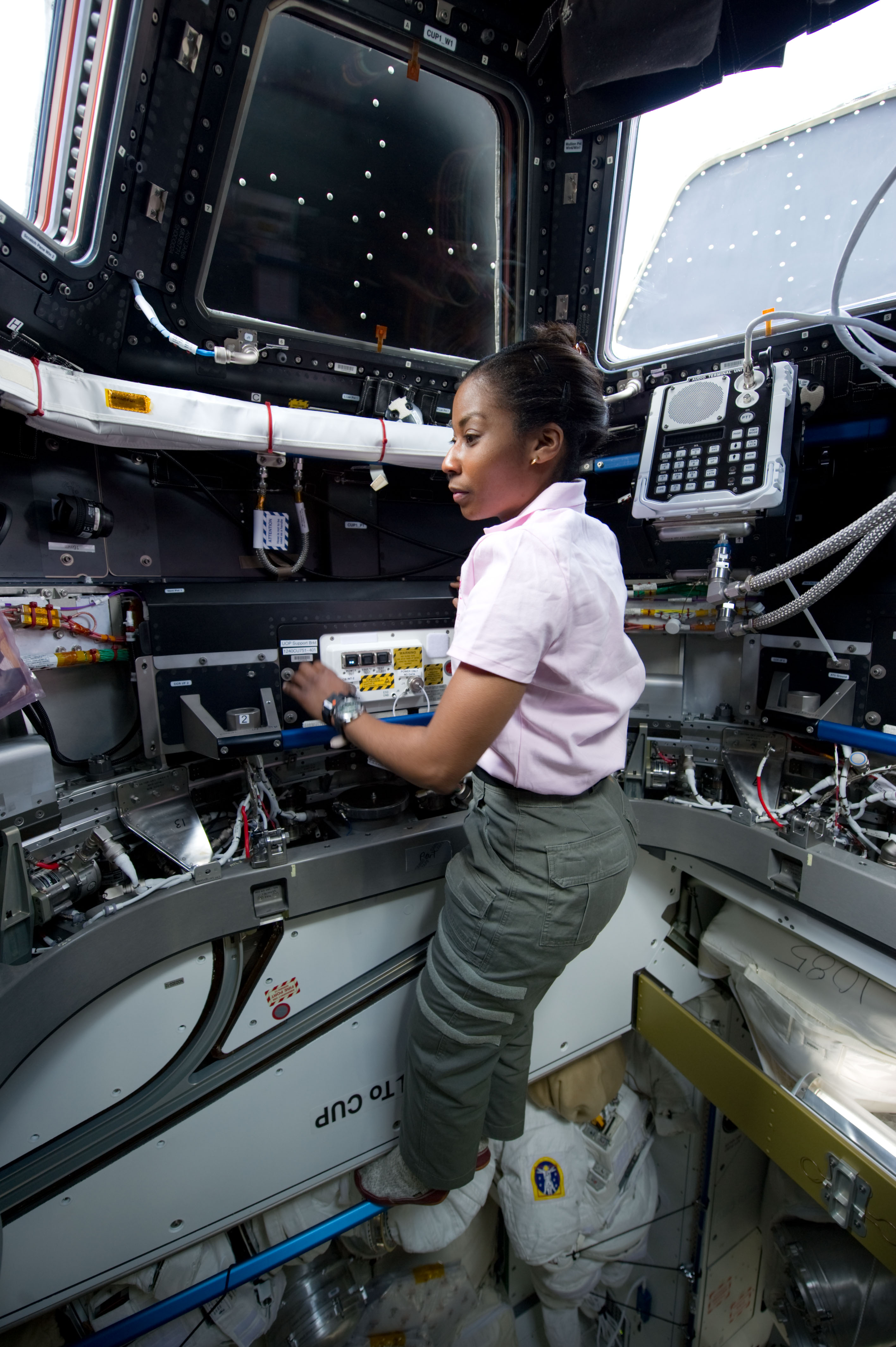
Wilson relaxing in the Cupola

=== April 9 (Flight Day 5 – EVA 1) ===
Flight day 5 saw the completion of the first spacewalk by Rick Mastracchio and Clayton Anderson. The pair released the new ammonia tank assembly for transfer to station for installation on a later spacewalk. They also removed an experiment from outside on the Kibo Exposed Facility, replaced a Rate Gyro Assembly (RGA) and performed several get-ahead tasks. The spacewalking pair was assisted by the SSRMS which was operated by pilot Jim Dutton and mission specialist Stephanie Wilson. While the spacewalk took place, Naoko Yamazaki was assisted by commander Alan Poindexter, and the Expedition 23 crew to move several of the large science racks from the MPLM Leonardo to their new location on the ISS.

Highlights from the first spacewalk (21 mins 43 secs).

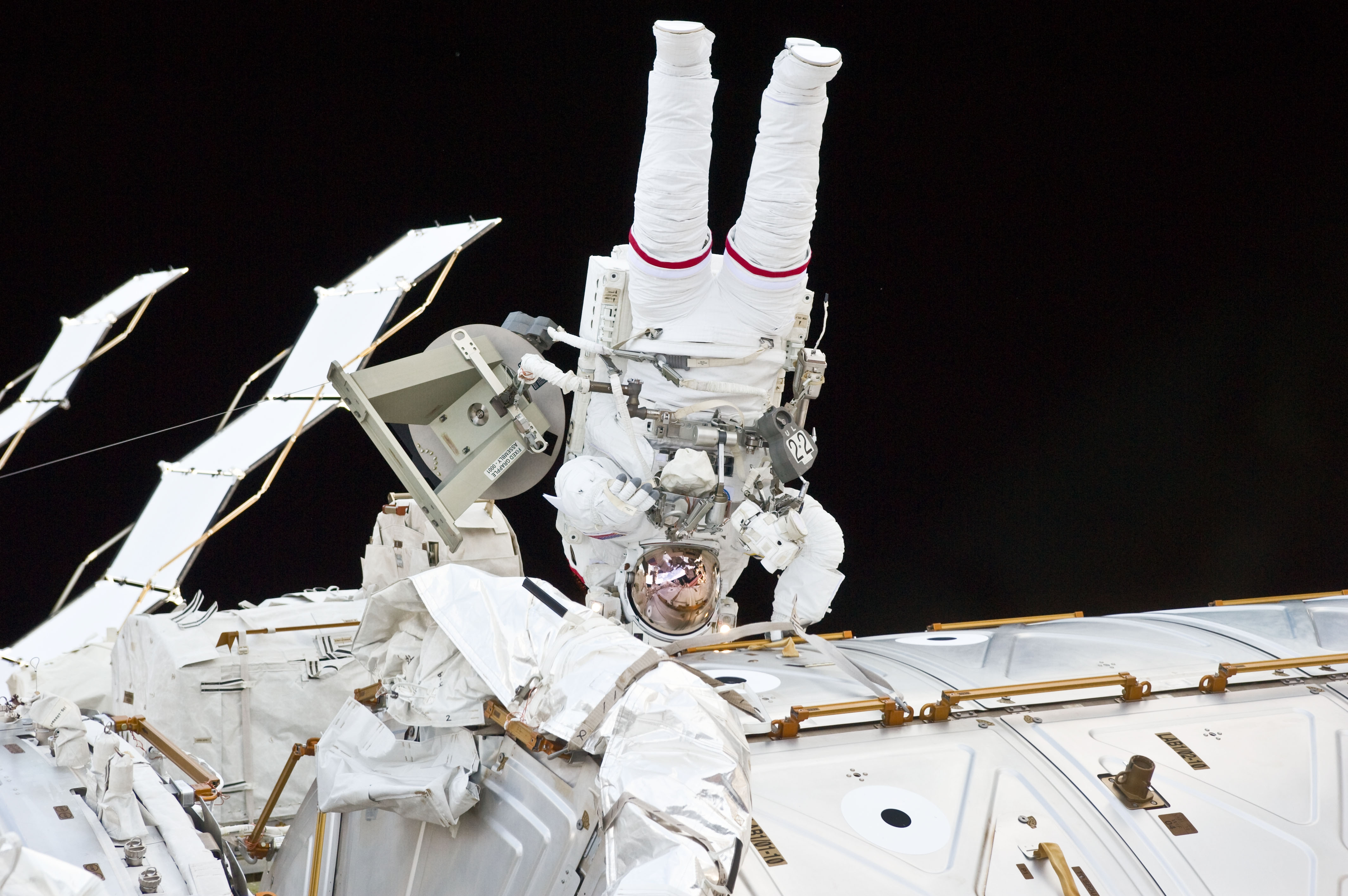
Mastracchio during EVA 1.

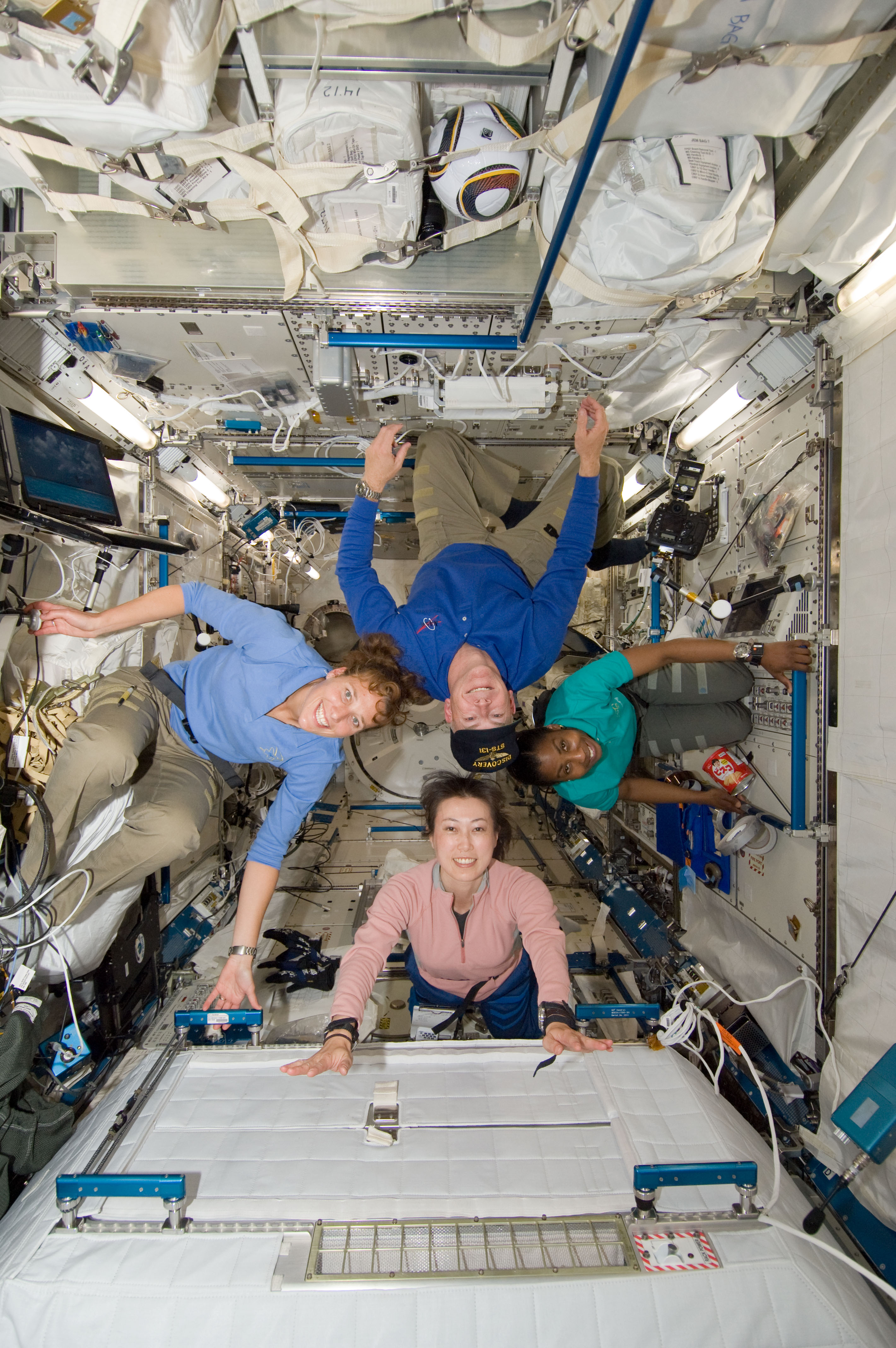
The crew enjoying time off

=== April 10 (Flight Day 6 – Transfers) ===
Flight day 6 was dedicated to transferring supplies from the MPLM Leonardo and the Space Shuttle mid-deck. The crews transferred the Windows Observational Research Facility (WORF) to the Destiny lab. Mission specialist Naoko Yamazaki, along with flight engineer Soichi Noguchi also transferred the Express Rack 7 (ER7) to its final location. During the crews morning, a smoke alarm sounded in the Russian segment of the station, which prompted the joint crew to move into emergency procedures. However the alarm was false and was cleared within a couple of minutes and all normal work resumed. Mission specialists Clay Anderson, Rick Mastracchio and Stephanie Wilson conducted in-flight interviews with Nebraska Public Radio, CBS Newspath and Radio Network and KETV-TV in Omaha, Nebraska. Later in the day commander Alan Poindexter, pilot Jim Dutton and mission specialist Dorothy Metcalf-Lindenburger talked with students at the Naval Postgraduate School in Monterey, California. At the end of the crews work day, the joint crew got together and reviewed the procedures for the second spacewalk. After the procedures review spacewalkers Clay Anderson and Rick Mastracchio entered the Quest airlock, closed the hatch and lowered the inside pressure to 10.2 psi. The pair also breathed pure oxygen for an hour while the pressure was being lowered.

Flight Day 6 highlights (19 minutes 58 seconds).

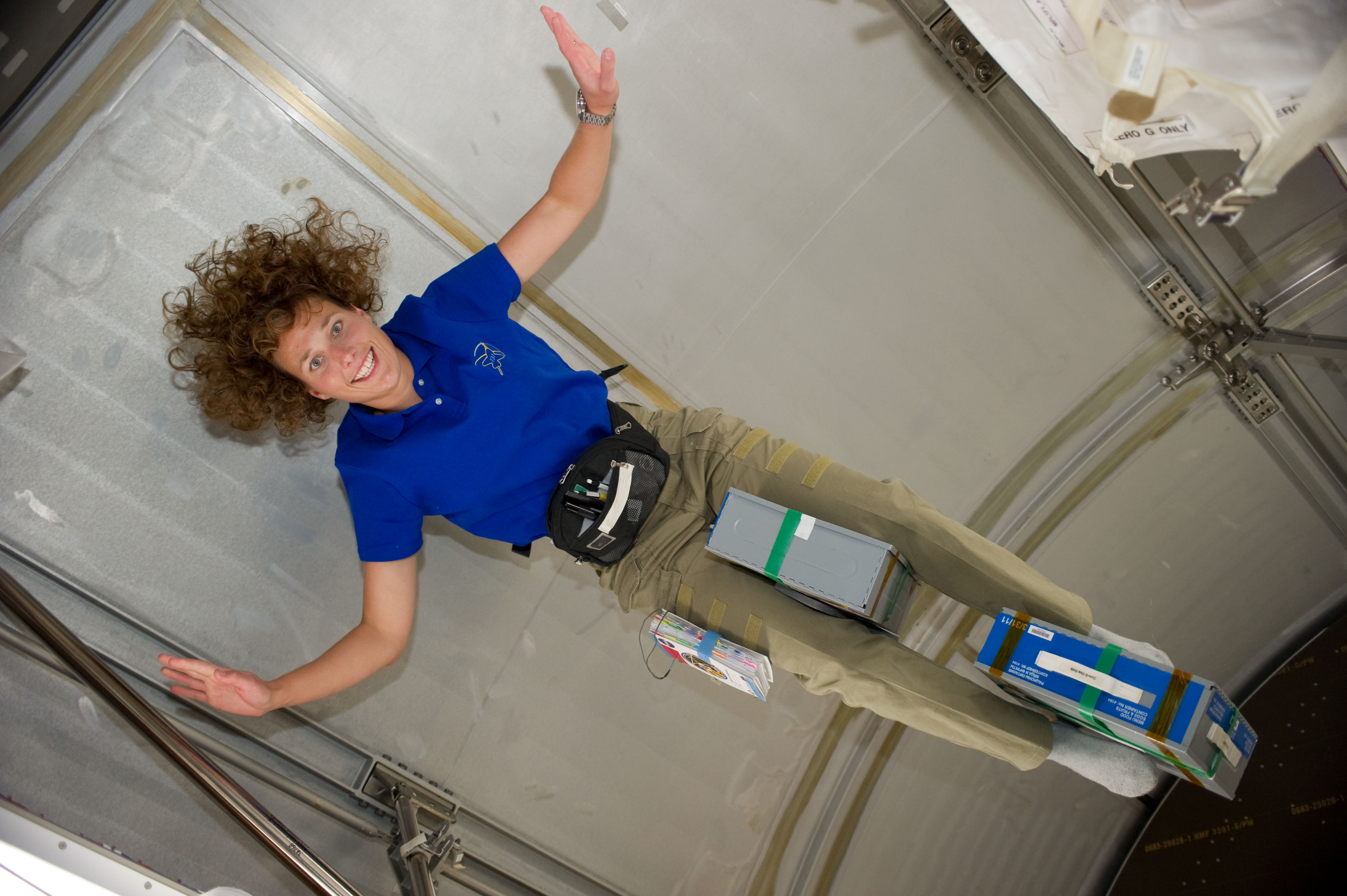
Dorothy Metcalf-Lindenburger inside the MPLM Leonardo.

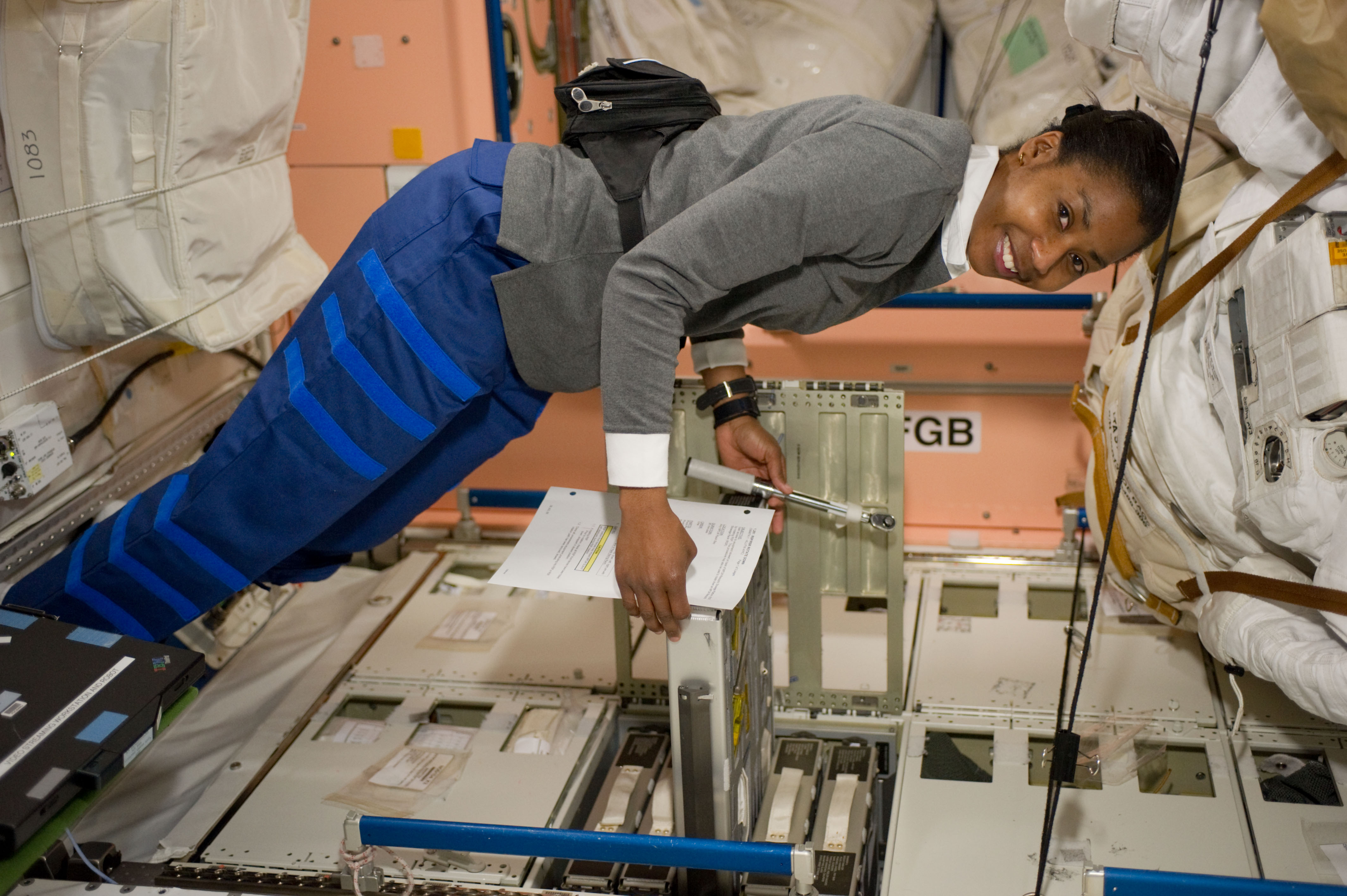
Stephanie Wilson with technical blueprints in Node 1

=== April 11 (Flight Day 7 – EVA 2) ===
On flight day 7, astronauts Clay Anderson and Rick Mastracchio performed their second spacewalk of the STS-131 mission. Mastracchio and Anderson exited the airlock at 05:30 UTC, a full 45 minutes ahead of the planned time, and spent 7 hours and 26 minutes outside the ISS. The pair removed the old Ammonia Tank Assembly (ATA) from the S1 truss and installed the new ATA. Anderson and Mastracchio ran into a small problem when one of the four bolts that holds the tank in place wouldn't turn. They loosened the other three and tried them all again and the fourth bolt was successfully tightened. The two spacewalkers helped guide the SSRMS to temporarily stow the old ATA on the truss structure. The new ATA had its electrical connections made, but the fluid connections were deferred until the third spacewalk since the EVA was behind the time-line. Mastracchio and Anderson also installed two radiator grapple fixture stowage beams on the P1 truss. While Anderson and Mastracchio were outside, members of the STS-131 crew continued transferring items from Space Shuttle Discovery's mid-deck and the MPLM Leonardo. Overall, the crew had completed about half of the transfer work.

Highlights from the second spacewalk (23 mins 54 secs)

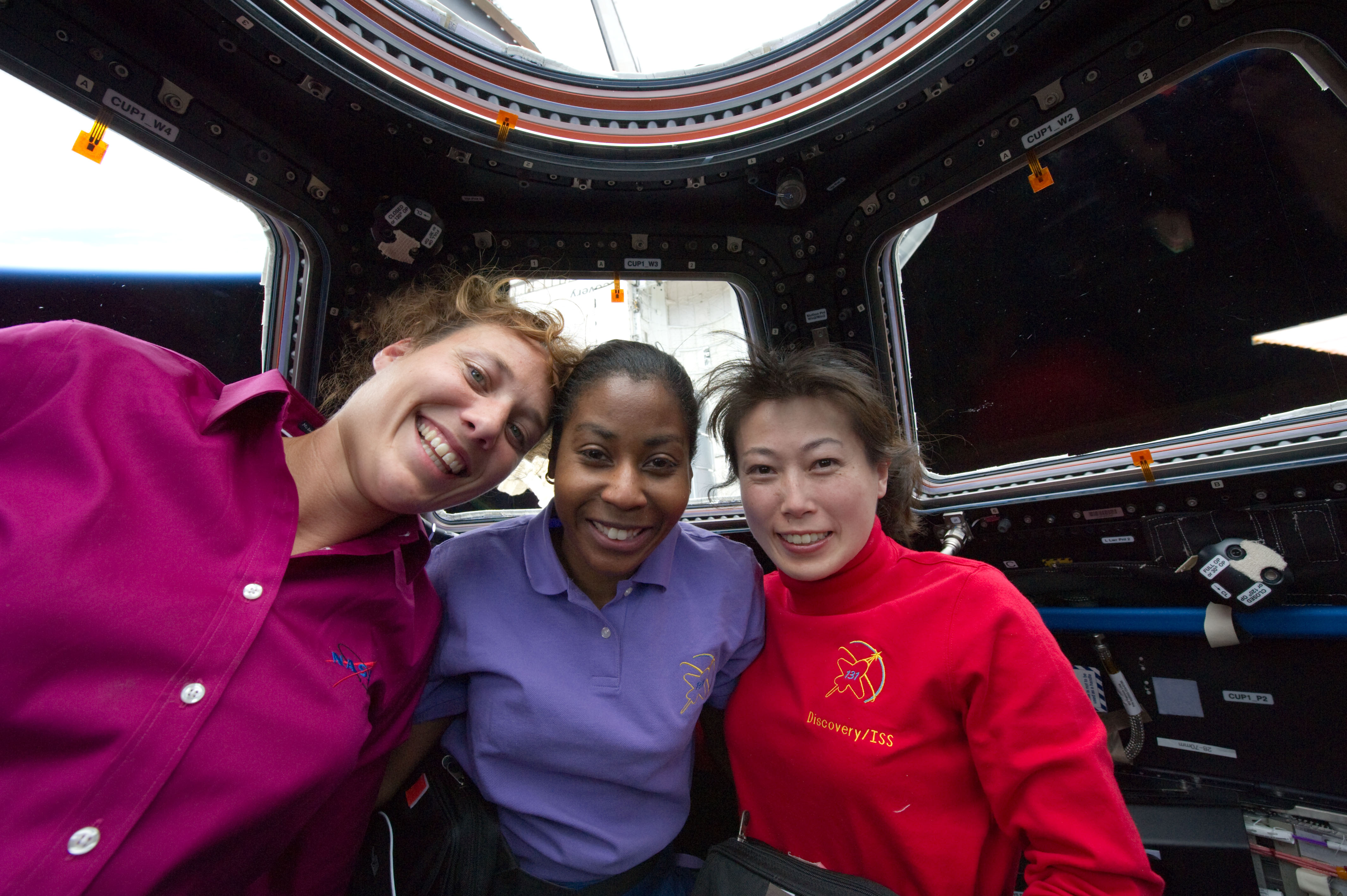
Group photo while in the cupola observing the EVA

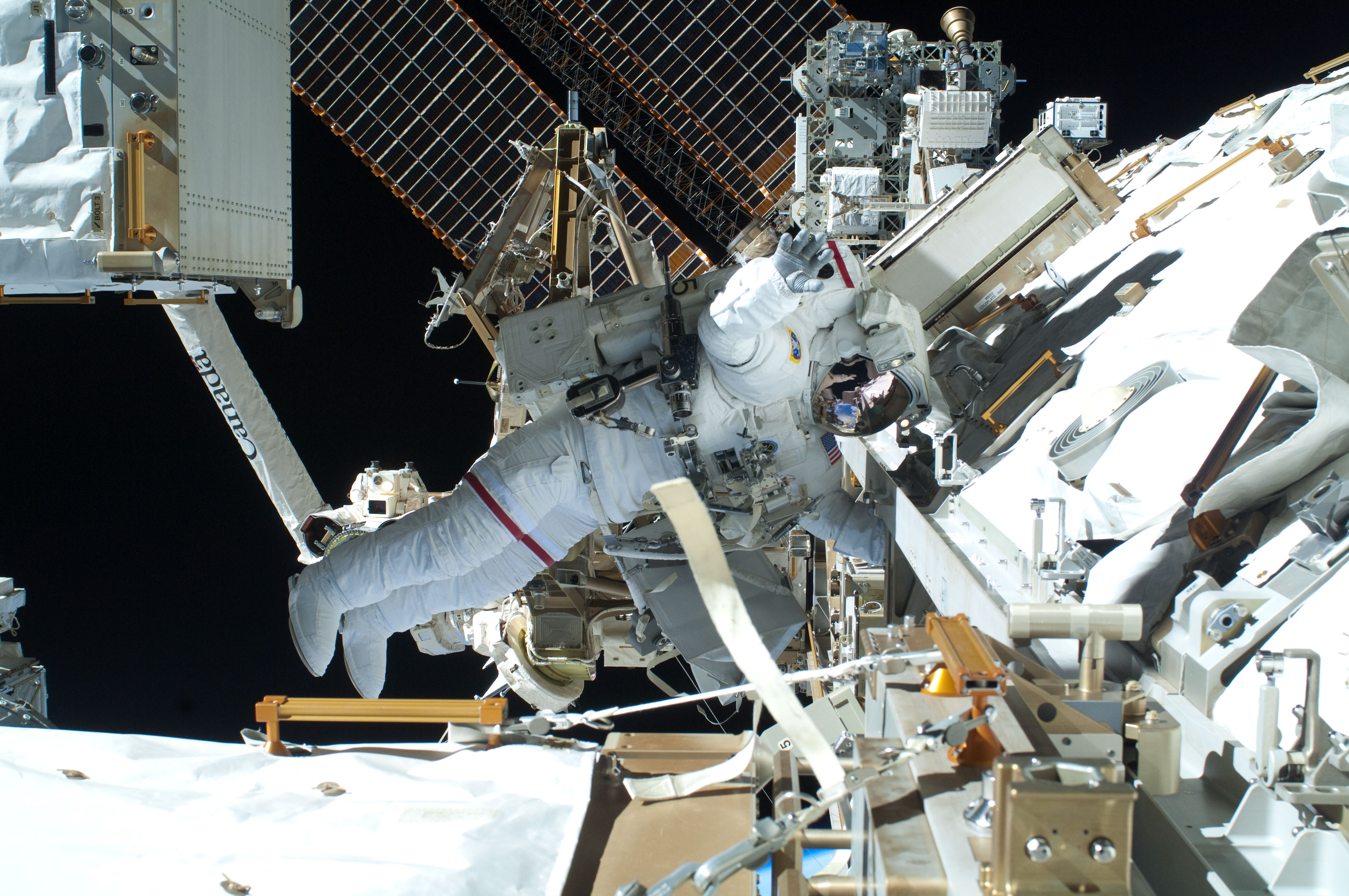
Mastracchio during EVA 2.

=== April 12 (Flight Day 8 – Off duty) ===
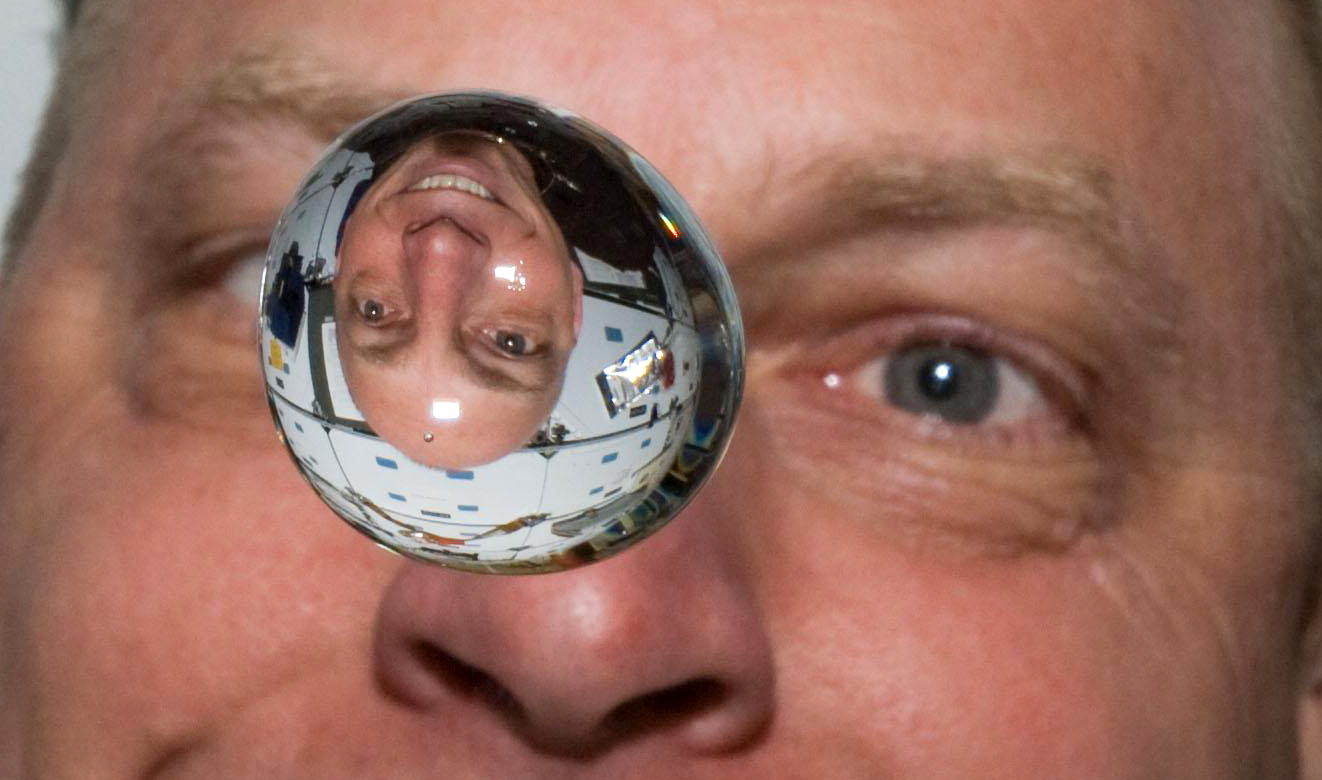
Astronaut Clayton Anderson playing with a water bubble.

The joint STS-131/Expedition 23 crews had the morning off on flight day 8. After their morning off the crews continued their transfer activities, which are more than seventy percent complete. The crews also conducted several PAO events, including VIP events with Roscosmos, Russian president Dmitry Medvedev, RSC Energia, the Japanese Aerospace Exploration Agency (JAXA), Japanese students, astronaut Mamoru Mohri, and Japanese dignitaries. Later, commander Alan Poindexter, pilot Jim Dutton, and mission specialists Dorothy Metcalf-Lindenburger and Stephanie Wilson participated in an in-flight interview with several American media outlets including Fox News, ABC World News, and MSNBC. While the PAO events took place, Rick Mastracchio and Clay Anderson were preparing the spacesuits and tools they will use for the third and final spacewalk. Later in the day the pair will have a procedures review with other members of the ISS and shuttle crews. After the review, they will enter the airlock, close the hatch and lower the pressure to 10.2 psi and breathe pure oxygen for their campout.

=== April 13 (Flight Day 9 – EVA 3) ===
On flight day 9, Rick Mastracchio and Clay Anderson completed the third and final spacewalk of the STS-131 mission. Their tasks included hooking up the ammonia and nitrogen lines to the new Ammonia Tank Assembly (ATA), installing the old ATA in the shuttle's payload bay, retrieving some Micro-Meteoroid Orbital Debris (MMOD) shields, bolting a grapple bar (which had been removed from the old ATA) onto the new ATA, and preparation of some cables on the Z1 truss and tools to be used during STS-132. During the installation of the old ATA in Discovery's payload bay, the spacewalkers had some problems securing a bolt on the ATA to the LMC. The spacewalk took 6 hours and 24 minutes, bringing the total EVA time to 20 hours and 19 minutes. While the EVA was going on, commander Alan Poindexter and mission specialist Naoko Yamazaki continued transferring items from the MPLM to the ISS. Transfer is more than seventy-five percent complete.

Highlights from flight day 9 (38 mins 14 secs).

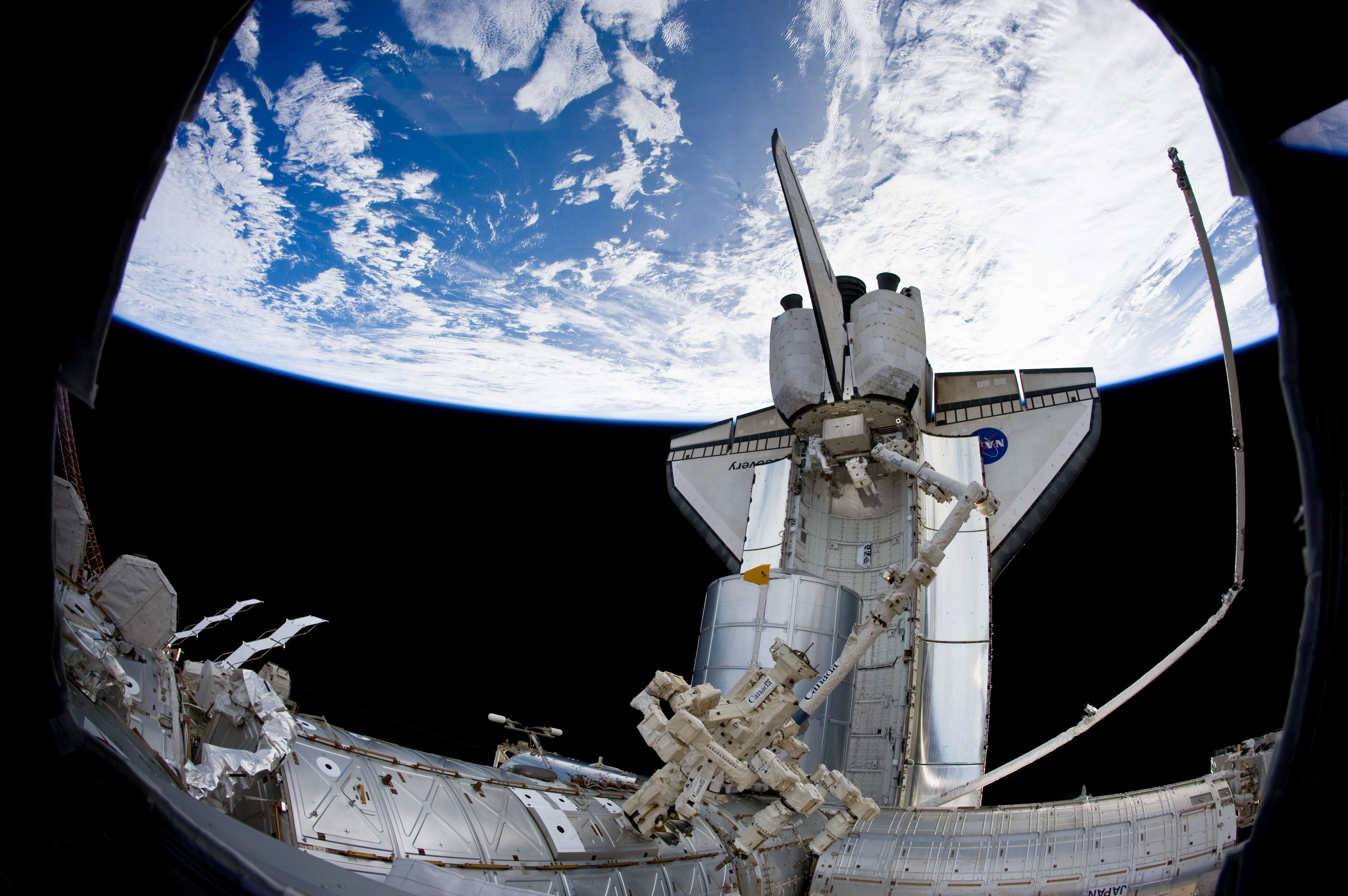
Mastracchio and Anderson working in Discovery's aft payload bay during EVA 3.

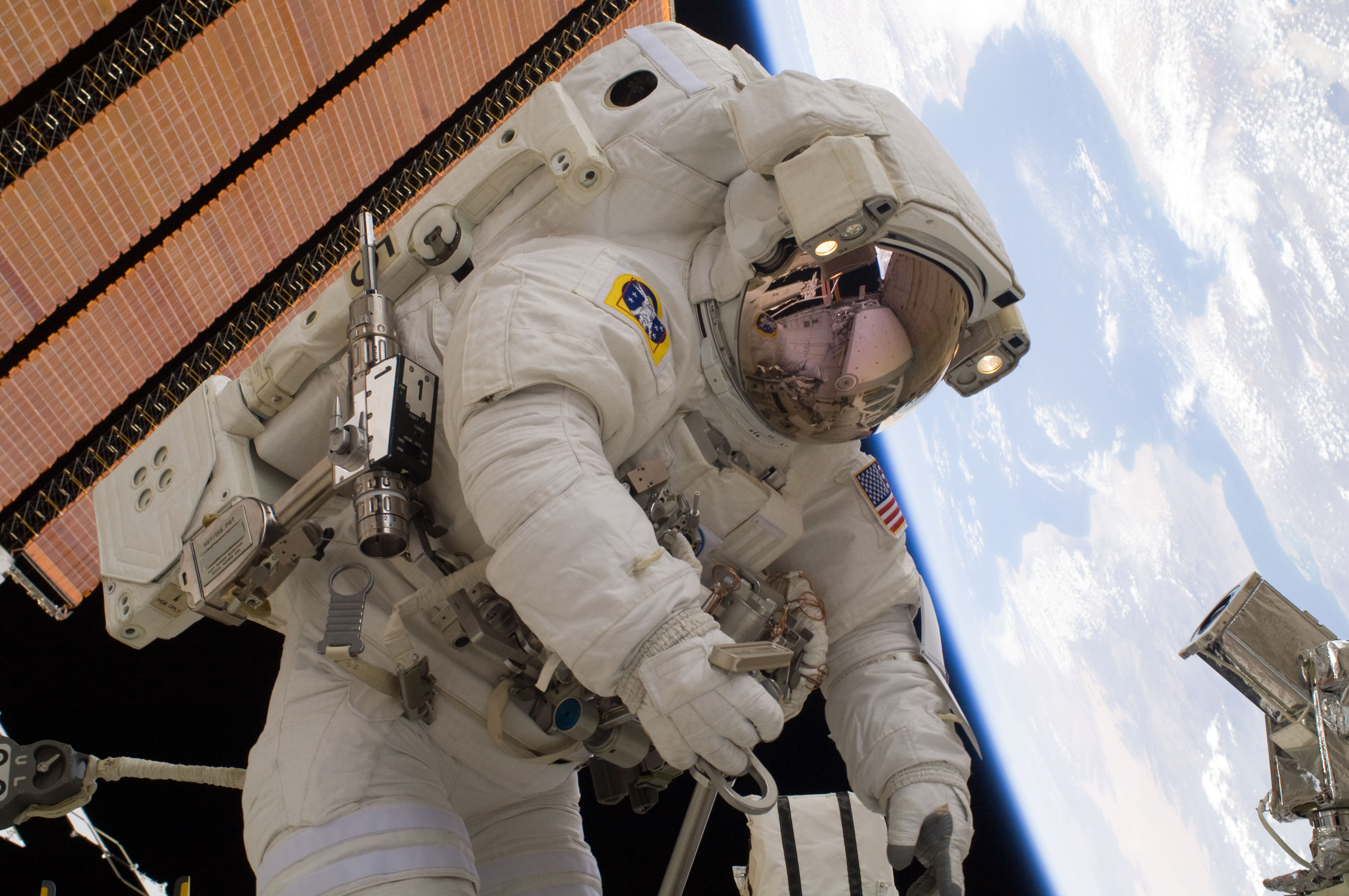
Clayton Anderson during EVA 3.

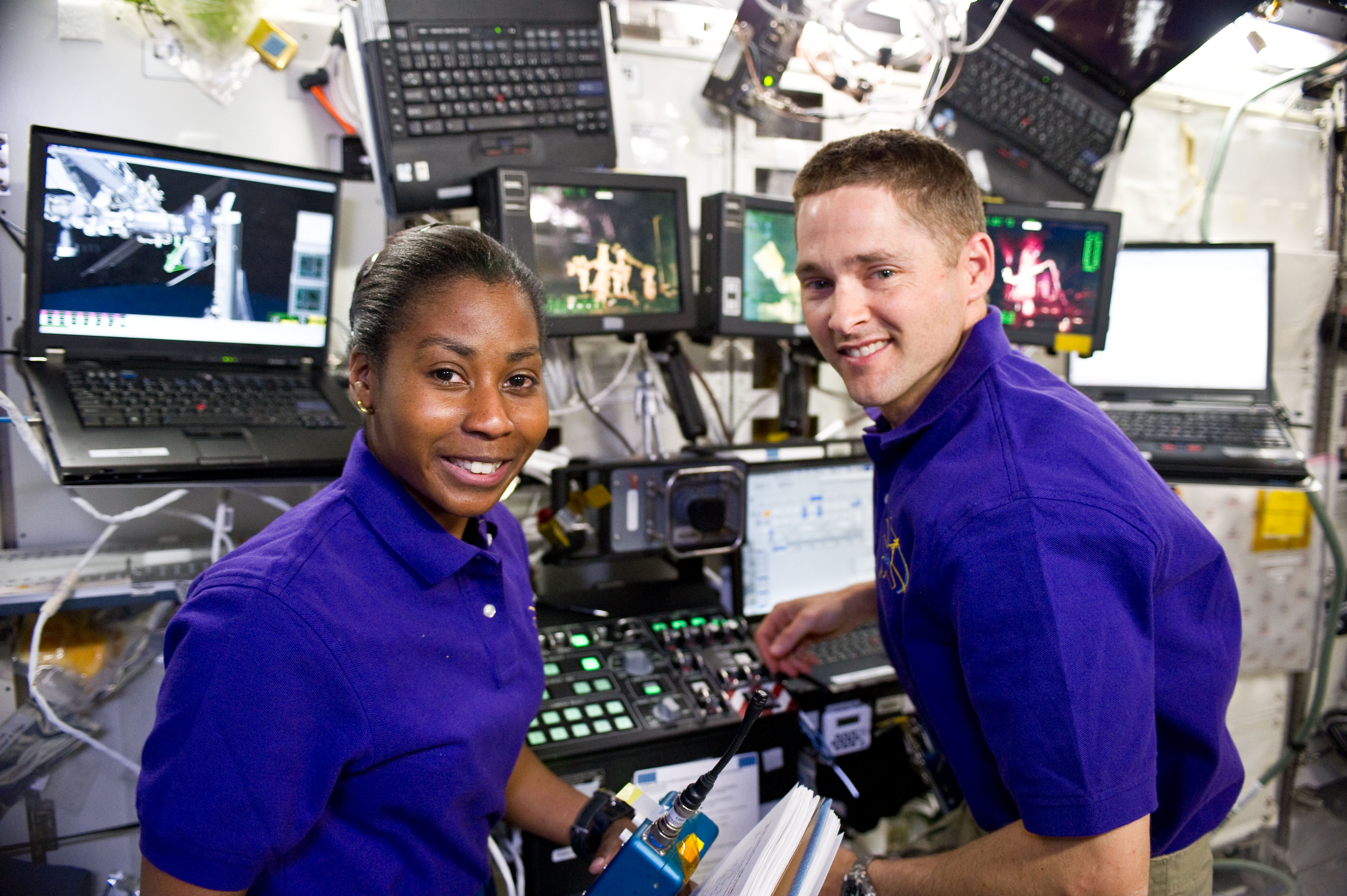
Stephanie Wilson and James Dutton in the US lab robotic workstation area

=== April 14 (Flight Day 10 – Final transfers/off duty) ===
The crew of STS-131 continued with transfer activities on the morning of flight day 10. The morning was devoted largely to transferring items to the MPLM Leonardo. There are only a few items awaiting transfer to Space Shuttle Discovery's mid-deck left. The crew enjoyed an hour long mid-day meal with the Expedition 23 crew. The entire joint crew took part in a crew photo, which was followed by a joint crew news conference with U.S., Russian and Japanese media. Later in the day, commander Alan Poindexter, mission specialists Dorothy Metcalf-Lindenburger, Stephanie Wilson, and Clayton Anderson took time out to talk with students from Eastern Guilford High School in Gibsonville, North Carolina and with third and fourth graders from that school district. The majority of the crews afternoon was spent off duty.

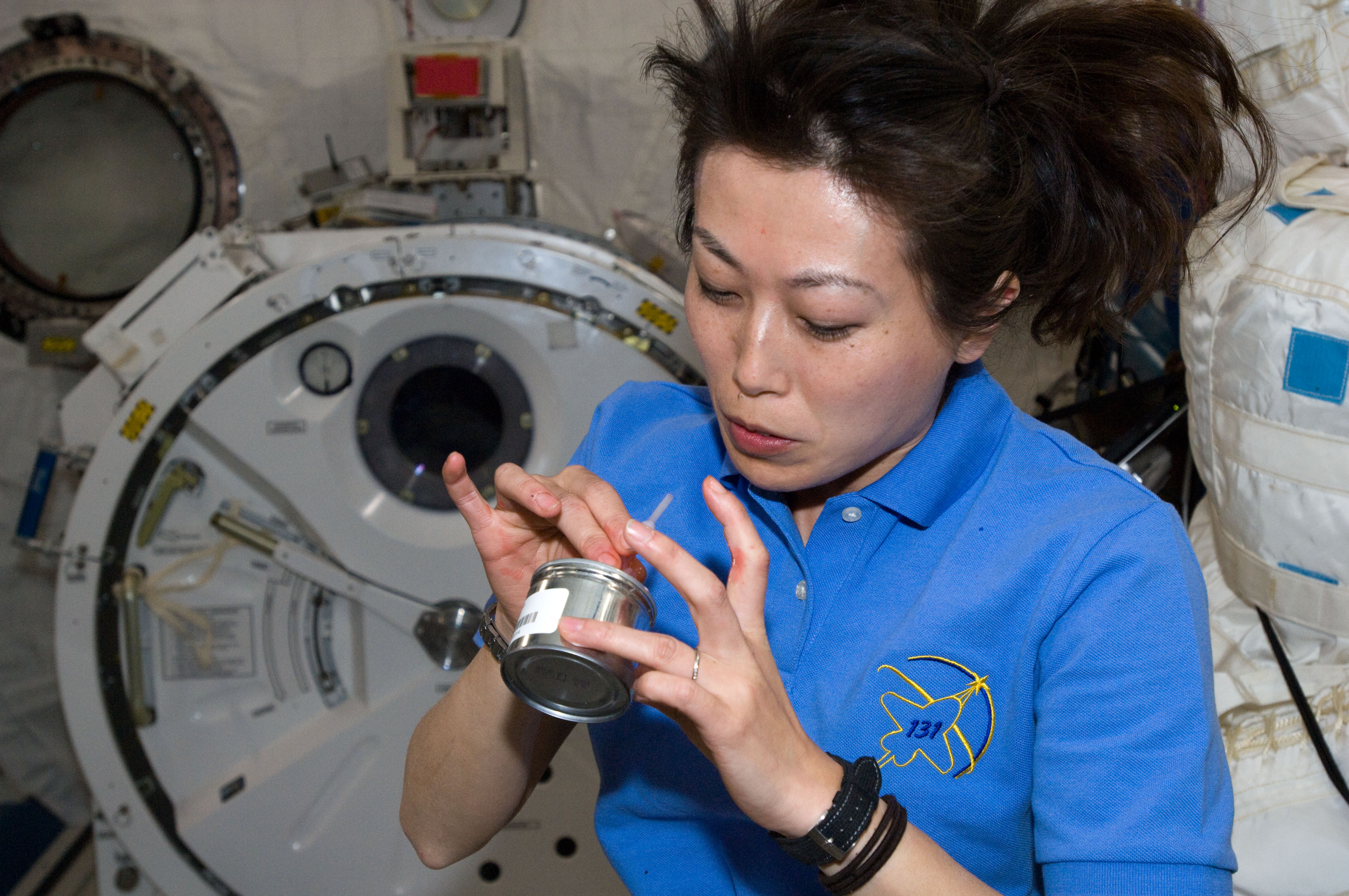
Naoko Yamazaki eats a snack in the Kibo laboratory.

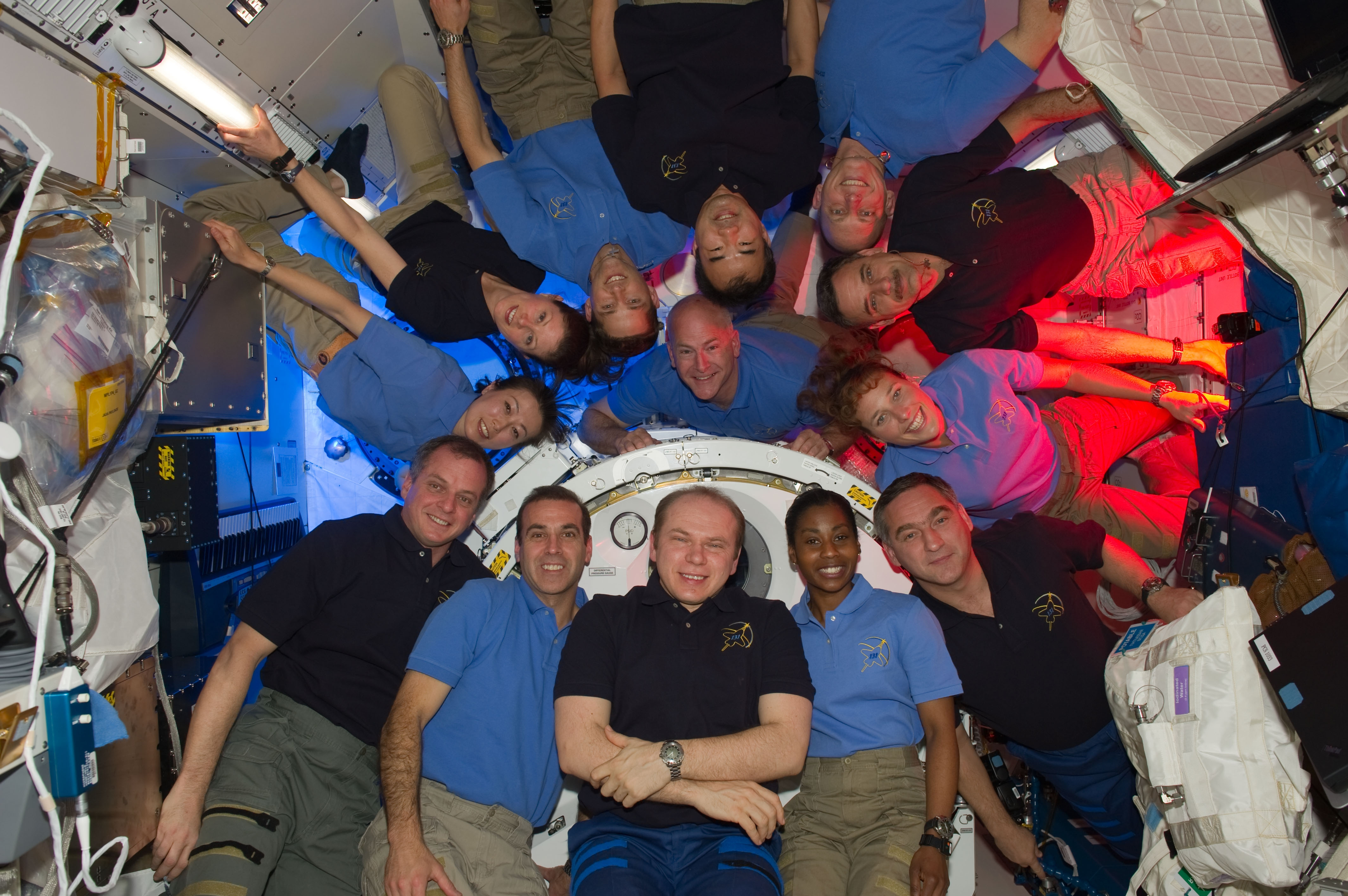
STS-131 and Expedition 23 crew members gather for a group portrait.

=== April 15 (Flight Day 11 – MPLM unberthing) ===
On flight day 11, the MPLM Leonardo's hatches were closed at 07:38 UTC (03:38 EDT) and the MPLM was unberthed from the nadir or Earth facing port of the Harmony node at 20:24 UTC (16:24 EDT). It was placed in a low hover, about 3 feet (0.91 m) above Shuttle Discovery's payload bay. This was done because the MPLM was unberthed from Harmony later than planned. The delay in unberthing was caused by a set of bolts on the Common Berthing Mechanism (CBM) getting stuck due to a broken pin. The crew will finish putting Leonardo in the payload bay on flight day 12, prior to the docked late inspection. The crews conducted some transfer operations between the ISS and shuttle mid-deck, which brings the overall transfer operations to ninety-four percent complete for the mission.

=== April 16 (Flight Day 12 – Late inspection) ===
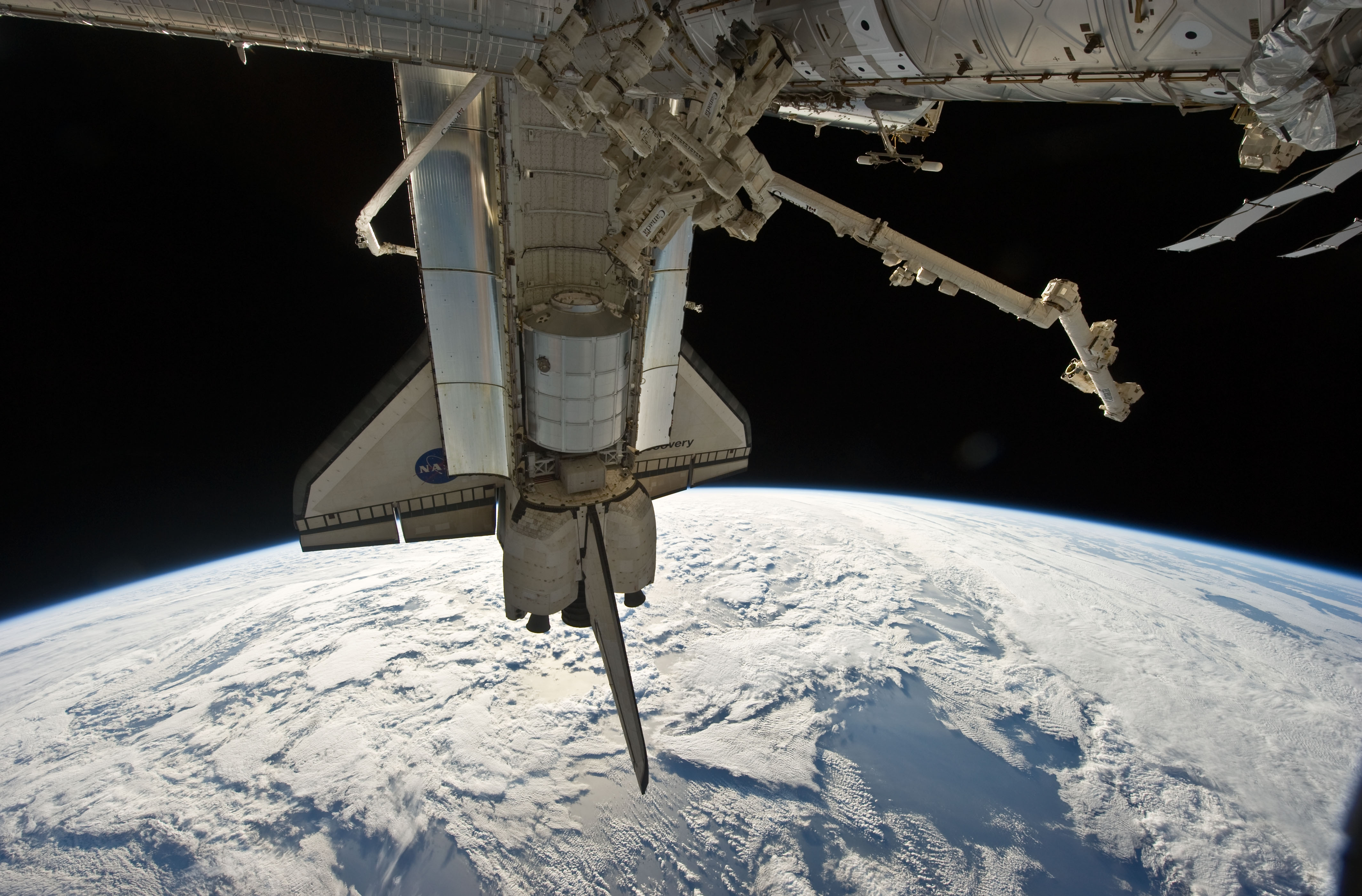
The MPLM Leonardo secured in Discovery's payload bay.

On flight day 12, the crew of Space Shuttle Discovery secured the MPLM Leonardo in the payload bay for return to Earth. Mission specialist Dorothy Metcalf-Lindenburger activated the latches to secure Leonardo in the payload bay at 07:15 UTC (03:15 EDT). After Leonardo was secured, Metcalf-Lindenburger, pilot Jim Dutton began the late inspection of Discovery's heat shield. The pair were joined by commander Alan Poindexter and mission specialist Naoko Yamazaki to complete the inspection of the shuttle's Reinforced Carbon-Carbon (RCC) panels on the wings and nose and the heat-resistant tiles. The scan, which takes about 7 hours, was completed 3 hours ahead of schedule, and it was done while still docked to the International Space Station (ISS) due to the loss of the shuttle's K_{u}-Band antenna.

=== April 17 (Flight Day 13 – Undocking) ===
Space Shuttle Discovery successfully undocked from the International Space Station (ISS) at 12:52 UTC (08:52 EDT). Discovery was docked to the ISS for 10 days, 5 hours, and 8 minutes. After Discovery departed from the ISS, pilot Jim Dutton took control of the shuttle and performed a fly around of the space station. The undocking was preceded by a farewell ceremony, where shuttle commander Alan Poindexter and station commander Oleg Kotov said farewells on behalf of their crews. After undocking the shuttle crew stowed the Orbiter Boom Sensor System (OBSS) and the Shuttle Remote Manipulator System (SRMS) since they will not be needed for the rest of the flight. The crew was also informed that Discovery's heat shield was cleared for re-entry into Earth's atmosphere.

Space Shuttle Discovery flies around the ISS after undocking (44 mins 7 secs).

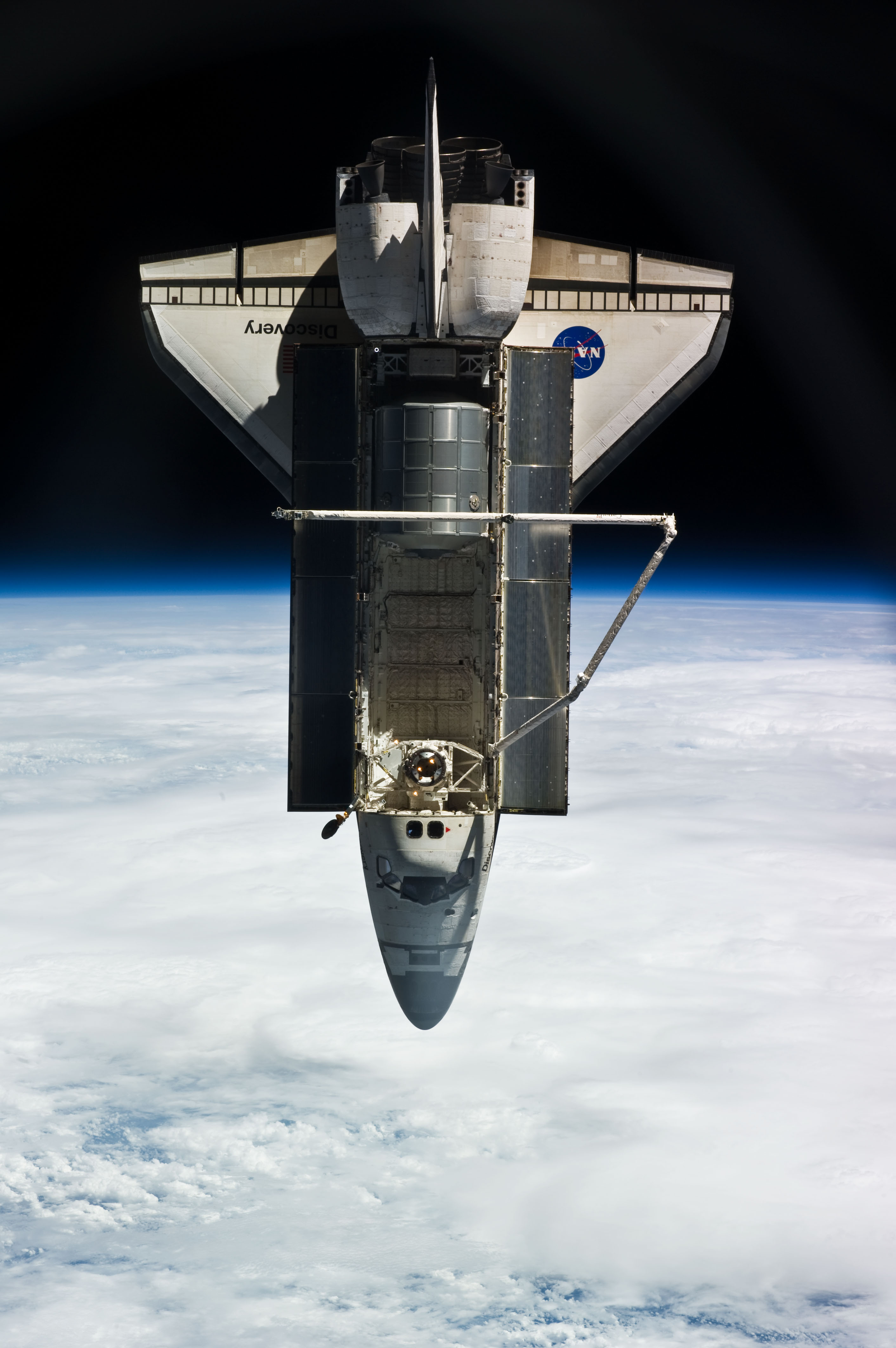
Discovery separates from the Space Station.

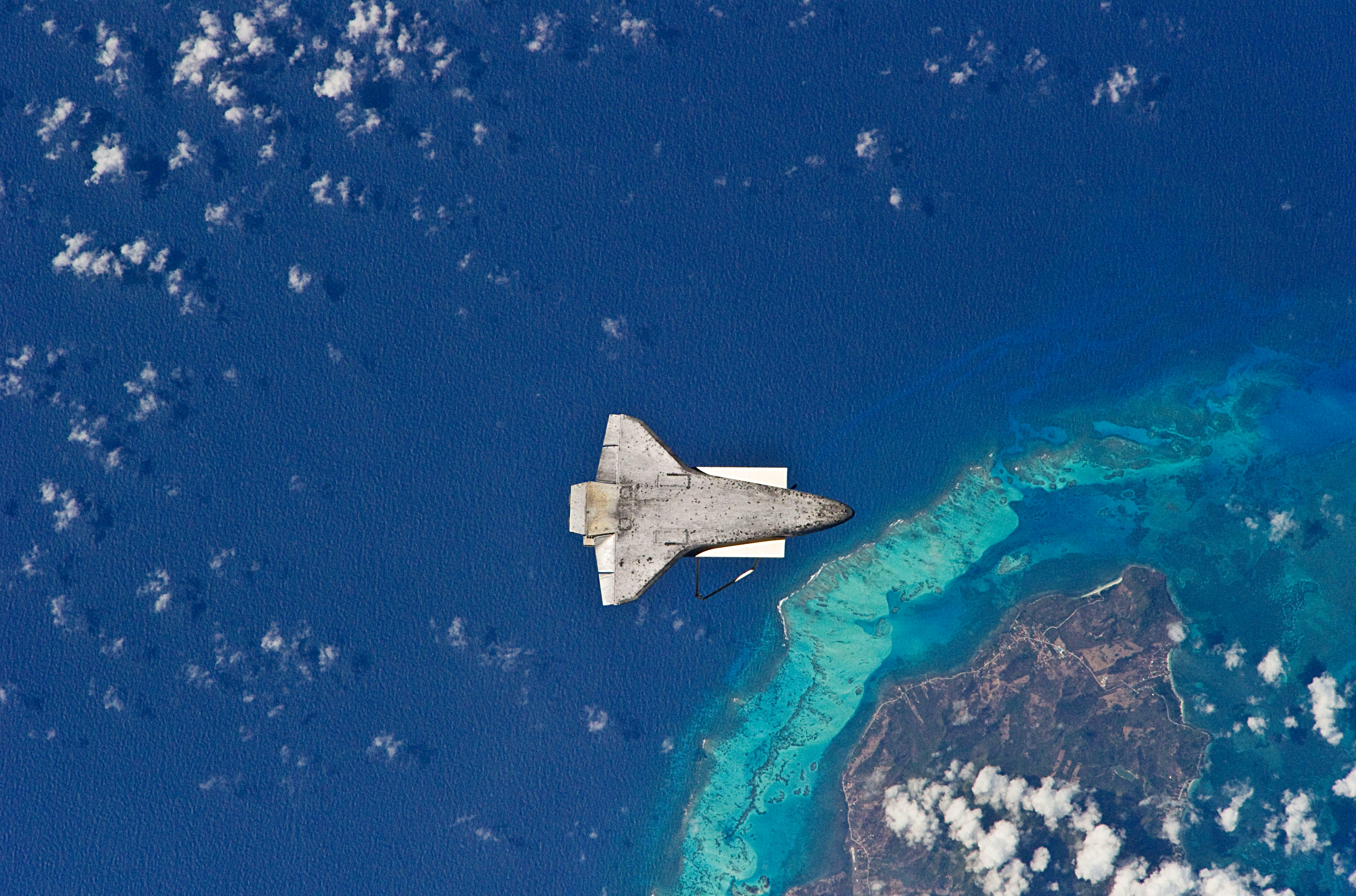
The underside of Discovery soon after post-undocking relative separation.

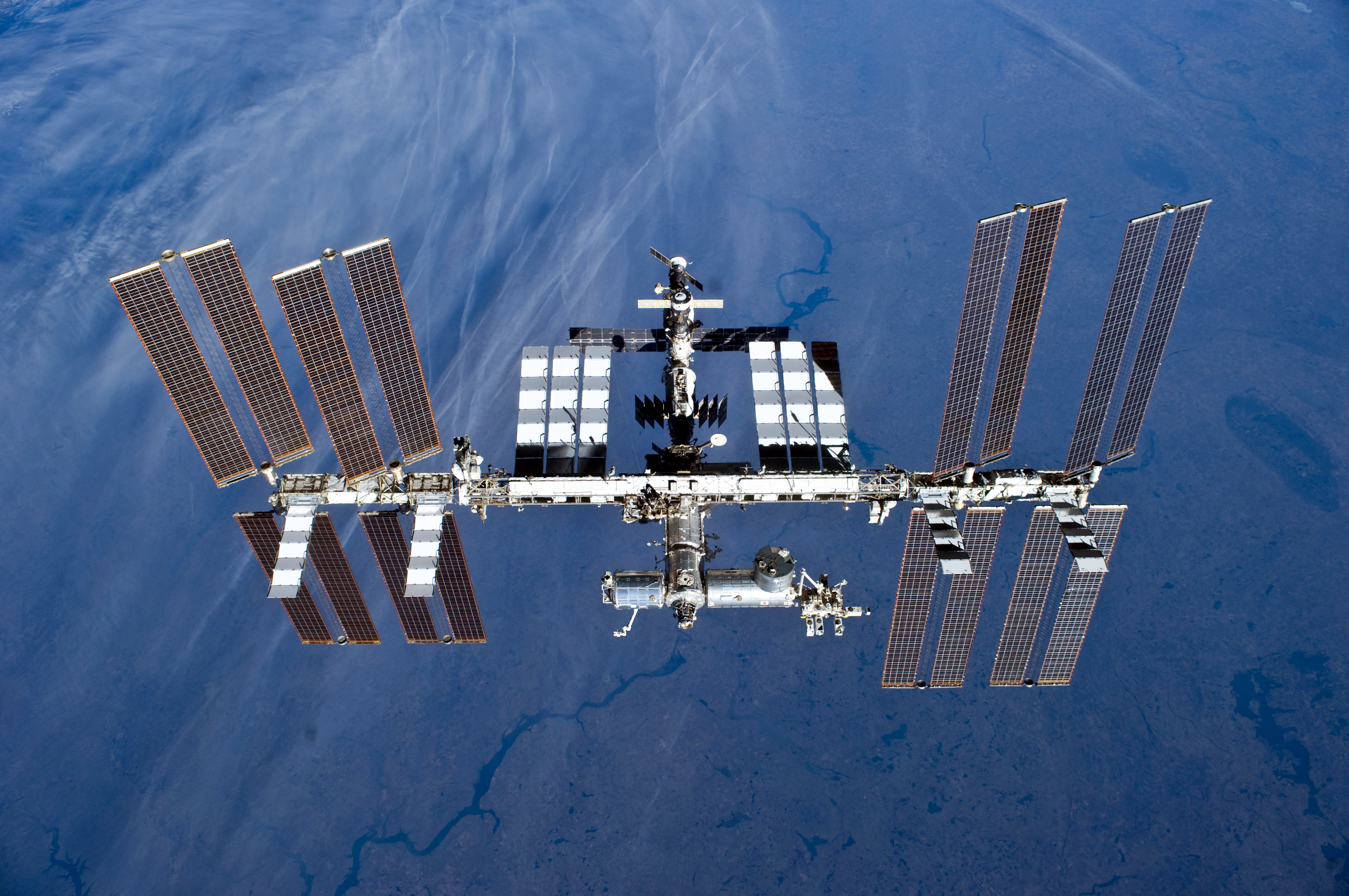
ISS seen from Discovery after undocking.

=== April 18 (Flight Day 14 – Landing prep) ===
On flight day 14, the crew of Space Shuttle Discovery began their final preparations for landing. The crew packed and stowed away items they no longer need for the rest of the flight. Throughout the day, commander Alan Poindexter and pilot Jim Dutton completed a series of checkouts of flight systems. These checks include 2 firings of the Reaction Control System (RCS) jets and a test of the Flight Control System (FCS). Once those checkouts were complete the pair began doing communications checkouts with the Merritt Island tracking station and tracking stations at the White Sands Space Harbor in New Mexico and Dryden Flight Research Center at Edwards Air Force Base. The crew also took time out of their day to conduct an in-flight interview with WBZ-AM in Boston, Massachusetts; the Associated Press; and KEZI-TV in Eugene.

=== April 19 (Flight day 15 – First landing opportunity) ===
The crew of STS-131 awoke for flight day 15 and began their deorbit preparations. These preparations include closing the payload bay doors, activating the Flash Evaporator System (FES) and getting into their Advanced Crew Escape Suits (ACES). The crew got as far as "fluid loading", where the crew consumes a set quantity of fluids to counteract the effects of gravity, in their deorbit preps. The crew was informed of the one orbit wave off about one hour prior to the deorbit burn. After the crew was told of the wave off, they held in their procedures to see if they would be given a go for the second landing opportunity. However, they were not given a go for the second chance and the crew began backing out of their deorbit preps. Both landing chances were waved off due to bad weather at the Kennedy Space Center.

=== April 20 (Flight day 16 – Landing) ===
Space Shuttle Discovery landed at 09:08 EDT (13:08 UTC) on runway 33 at Florida's Kennedy Space Center following a two-week mission in space.

Landing video (7 mins 49 secs).

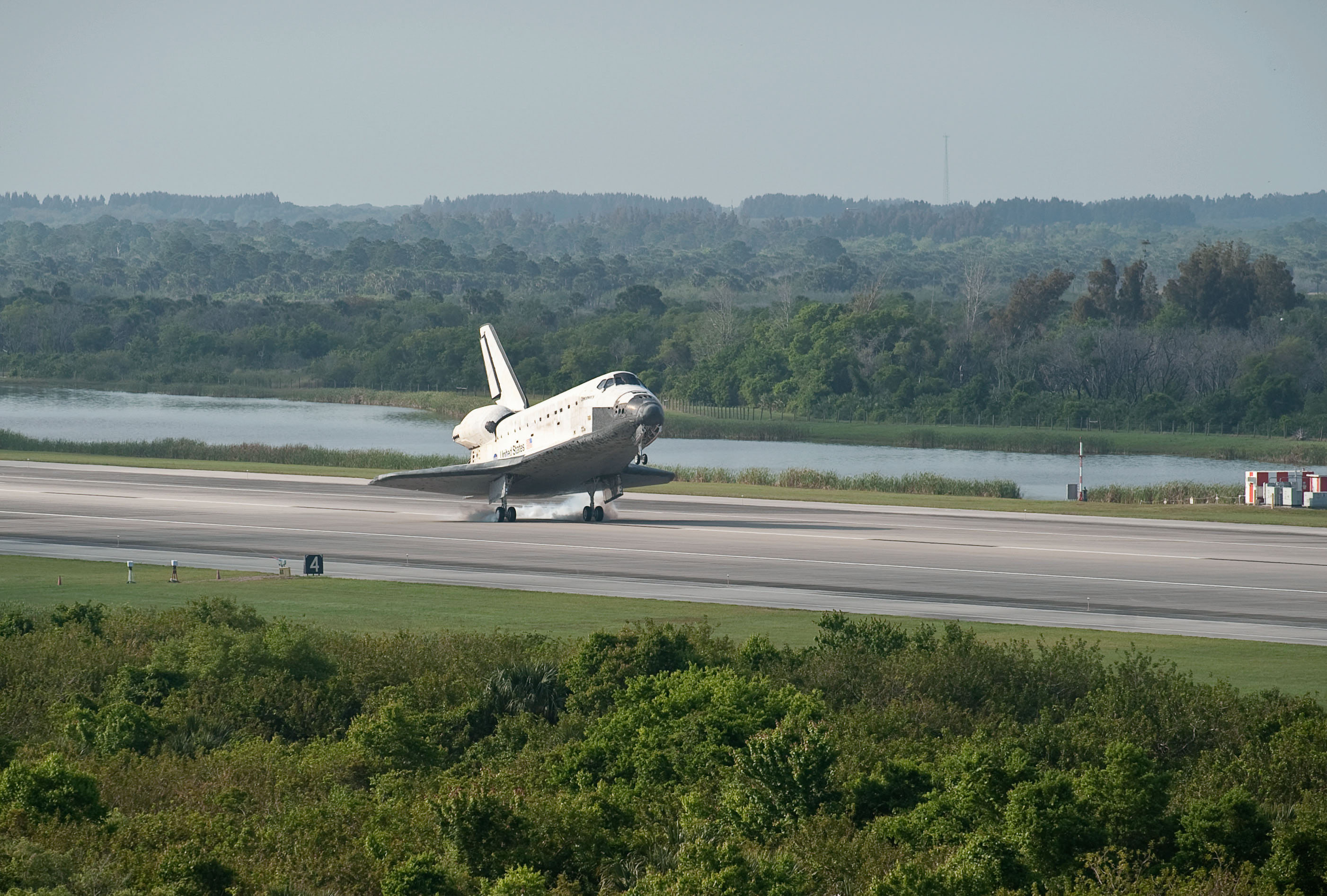
Discovery lands on runway 33 at KSC ending the STS-131 mission.

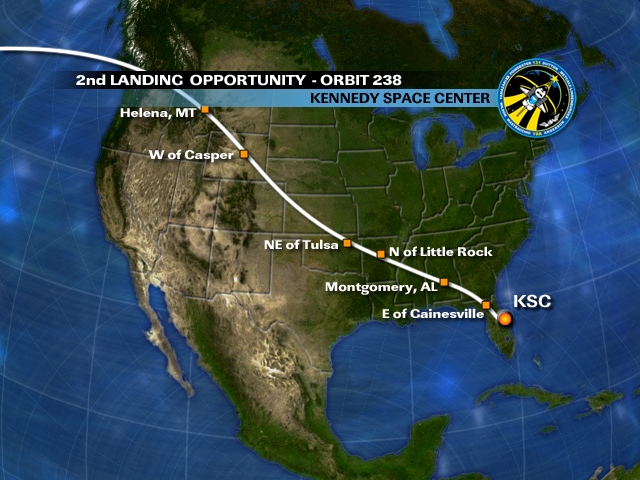
Flyover cities during the landing.

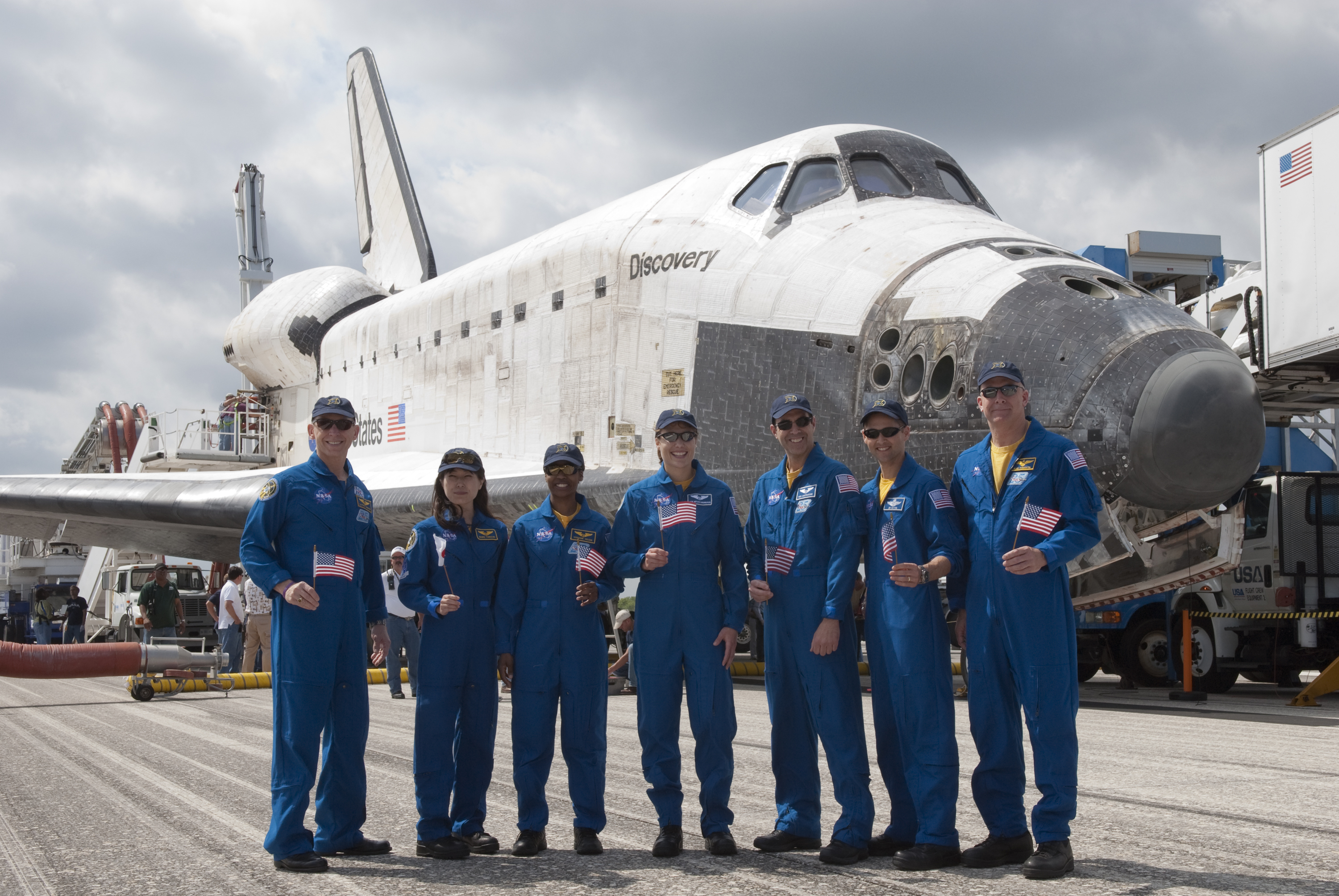
Crew on the tarmac.

== Spacewalks ==
At least three spacewalks were planned for this mission. The main objectives for the three EVAs were as follows:

EVA	Spacewalkers	Start (UTC)	End (UTC)	Duration
EVA 1	Rick Mastracchio; Clayton Anderson	April 9, 2010; 05:31	April 9, 2010; 11:58	6 hours 27 minutes
EVA 1	The crew inside used the station's robotic arm to remove a new ammonia tank from shuttle's payload bay and temporarily stow it on the station. The spacewalkers then retrieved a seed experiment from outside the Japanese laboratory, installed a grapple bar to the new ammonia tank on the station's truss and replaced a failed gyroscope that is part of the station's navigation system, along with several get-ahead tasks.			
EVA 2	Mastracchio; Anderson	April 11, 2010; 05:30	April 11, 2010; 12:56	7 hours 26 minutes
EVA 2	Crew members, using the station's arm, removed an empty ammonia tank from the station's truss and temporarily stowed it on an equipment cart. The new tank was then installed and electrical connections were made to it. The station's arm then temporarily stowed the old tank on another part of the station's structure until the mission's third spacewalk.			
EVA 3	Mastracchio; Anderson	April 13, 2010; 06:14	April 13, 2010; 12:36	6 hours 24 minutes
EVA 3	Using the station's arm, the crew moved the old tank into the shuttle's payload bay for return to Earth. The spacewalkers also removed a grapple bar from the old ammonia tank and attached it to the new one. The pair then relocated a foot restraint and some tools and prepared some cables for the STS-132 mission.			

== Wake-up calls ==
NASA began a tradition of playing music to astronauts during the Gemini program, which was first used to wake up a flight crew during Apollo 15. Each track is specially chosen, often by their families, and usually has a special meaning to an individual member of the crew, or is applicable to their daily activities.

Flight Day	Song	Artist	Played for	Links
Day 2	"Find Us Faithful"	Steve Green	Clay Anderson	WAV, MP3; TRANSCRIPT
Day 3	"I Will Rise"	Chris Tomlin	Jim Dutton	WAV, MP3; TRANSCRIPT
Day 4	"Hato to Shōnen" (The Pigeons and a Boy)	Joe Hisaishi	Naoko Yamazaki	WAV, MP3; TRANSCRIPT
Day 5	"Defying Gravity"	Idina Menzel & Kristin Chenoweth	Dorothy Metcalf-Lindenburger	WAV, MP3; TRANSCRIPT
Day 6	"We Weren't Born to Follow"	Bon Jovi	Rick Mastracchio	WAV, MP3; TRANSCRIPT
Day 7	"Stairway To The Stars"	Ella Fitzgerald	Stephanie Wilson	WAV, MP3; TRANSCRIPT
Day 8	"Because We Believe"	Andrea Bocelli	Alan Poindexter	WAV, MP3; TRANSCRIPT
Day 9	"Galileo"	Indigo Girls	Dorothy Metcalf-Lindenburger	WAV, MP3; TRANSCRIPT
Day 10	"The Miracle of Flight"	Mike Hyden	Clay Anderson	WAV, MP3; TRANSCRIPT
Day 11	"The Earth in the Color of Lapis Lazuli"	Seiko Matsuda	Naoko Yamazaki	WAV, MP3; TRANSCRIPT
Day 12	Opening theme to Stargate SG-1	Joel Goldsmith	Rick Mastracchio	WAV, MP3; TRANSCRIPT
Day 13	"Joy"	Newsboys	Jim Dutton	WAV, MP3; TRANSCRIPT
Day 14	"What A Wonderful World"	Louis Armstrong	Stephanie Wilson	WAV, MP3; TRANSCRIPT
Day 15	"Star Spangled Banner"		Alan Poindexter	WAV, MP3; TRANSCRIPT
Day 16	"On The Road Again"	Willie Nelson	The entire crew	WAV, MP3; TRANSCRIPT

== See also ==
- 2010 in spaceflight
- List of human spaceflights
- List of International Space Station spacewalks
- List of Space Shuttle missions
- List of spacewalks 2000–2014
