= EXPORT =

Measuring instrument on the International Space Station

EXPORT is an exobiology project led by the European Space Agency, that deployed an external module to the International Space Station to study the photo-processing of organic molecules and the survival of some micro-organisms, as well as the effect of solar UV on unshielded organic molecules and micro-organisms while exposed to outer space.

== Payload ==
The payload originally consisted of two independent modules, EXPOSE and Sky Polarization Observatory (SPOrt).

- EXPOSE was a facility holding multiple exobiology experiments that study the photo-processing of organic molecules and the survival of micro-organisms in space, as well as the effect of solar UV on unshielded organic molecules and micro-organisms. The EXPOSE experiment had 12 sample compartments; each held a sample carrier. EXPOSE was placed in 2008 on an external platform on the Columbus – External Payload Facility where it remained for 1.5 years.
- The second instrument, Sky Polarization Observatory, was an Italian astrophysical instrument to measure celestial polarisation range of 20–90 GHz. SPOrt goals included the first polarisation map of the Milky Way galaxy at the unexplored microwave frequencies of 22, 32 & 60 GHz and all-sky measurements in the cosmological window (90 GHz) with unprecedented sensitivity. However, due to the project's reliance on the Space Shuttle, and the setback of the Columbia disaster, the observatory was canceled in 2005.

== See also ==
- Bion
- BIOPAN
- Biosatellite program
- O/OREOS
- Scientific research on the ISS
