= Columbus External Payload Facility =

Part of the Columbus module on the International Space Station

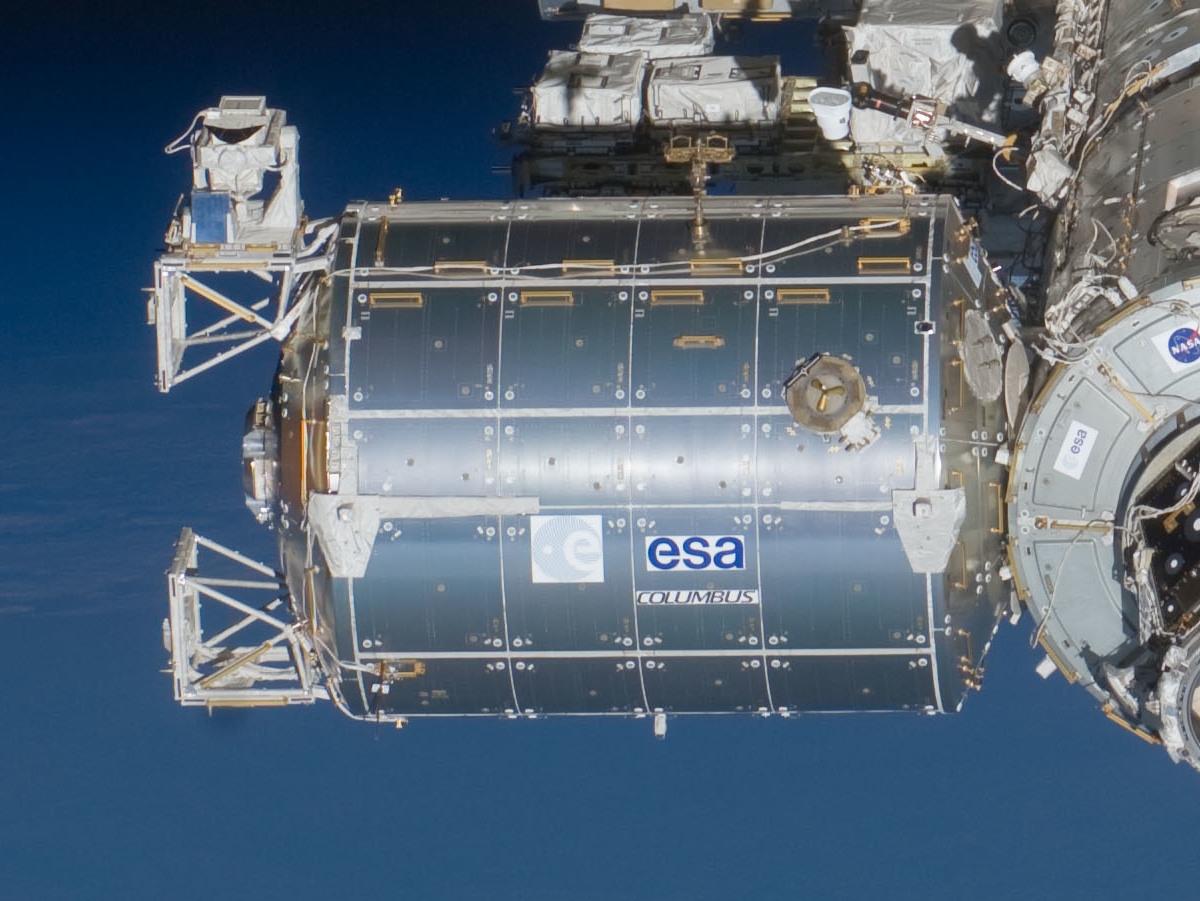
Columbus module in 2011. External Payload Facility seen on the left.

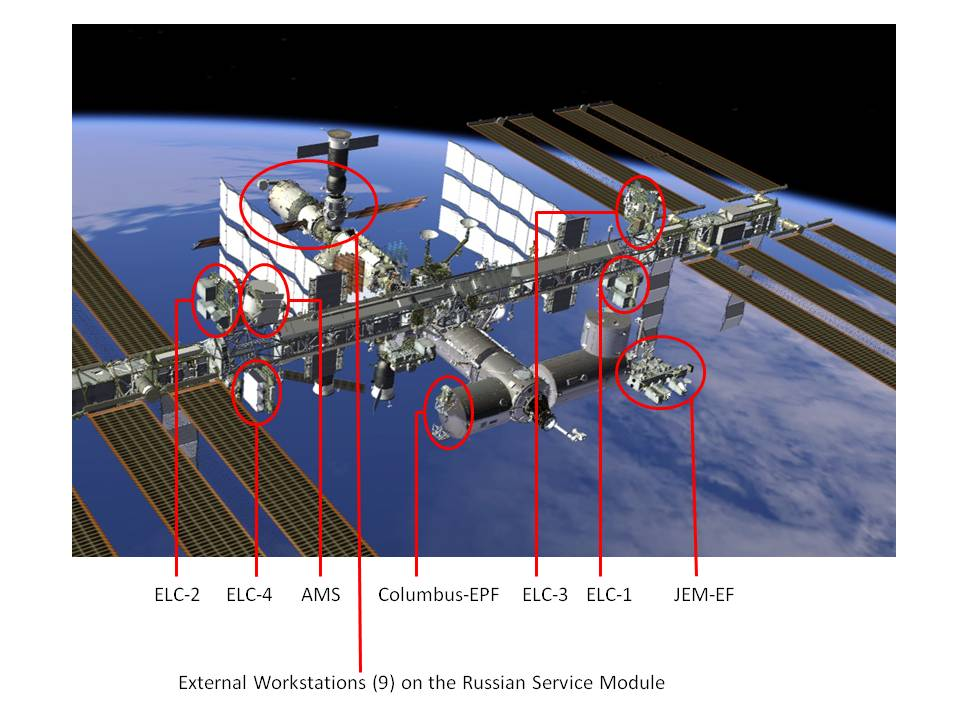
Illustration of the completed ISS during the 2010s with external workstations labeled

The Columbus External Payload Facility (Columbus-EPF) is a component of the European Columbus module on the International Space Station (ISS). It consists of two identical L-shaped consoles attached to the starboard cone of Columbus in the zenith (top) and nadir (bottom) positions, each supporting two platforms for external payloads or payload facilities. Four external payloads (payload facilities) can be operated at the same time. An additional external payload platform called Bartolomeo was installed on Columbus in 2020.

== History ==
Columbus-EPF was transported to the International Space Station (ISS) with the Columbus module on STS-122/1E in February 2008. Columbus-EPF payloads and payload facilities are transported to and from orbit using a carrier supplied by the ISS Program. The payloads and payload facilities are manoeuvred by the robotic manipulators of the ISS to their final operational locations on the Columbus-EPF. Each payload or payload facility has an open view to ram and to starboard, as well as one to either zenith or nadir. The view in the wake direction is reduced by ISS structures. At the end of its operational phase, a payload is transported to the carrier by robotic means and returned to ground for post-mission inspection and analysis and, possibly, refurbishment.

The first Columbus-EPF payload facilities were the European Technology Exposure Facility (EuTEF) and Sun Monitoring on the External Payload Facility of Columbus (Solar), which were installed during an extravehicular activity (EVA) by crew members of the STS 122 mission .

== Functions ==
In addition to structural support, Columbus can supply power and data (command) to the Columbus-EPF payloads and can poll the payloads for housekeeping (health and status) and user data. The power and data interfaces available to the Columbus-EPF payloads are directly connected to the Columbus internal distribution systems. Columbus-EPF payloads and payload facilities are controlled and commanded via Columbus using the same data links and ground segment infrastructure used for internal payloads. Each payload has a facility-responsible centre that can transmit commands and receive telemetry via the Columbus Control Centre. Columbus provides a maximum of 1.25 kW per Columbus-EPF location. Each Columbus-EPF location is connected to two 120-Vdc power feeders, each of which has a maximum allocation of 1.25 kW. Switching between the power feeders is done via the payload power switch box in Columbus and requires the power feeders to be powered down.

The maximum on-orbit mass of an external Columbus-EPF payload, including the adapter plate, is 290 kg. The dimensions of a payload should not exceed 864 x 1168 x 1245 mm without the adapter plate.

== Bartolomeo ==
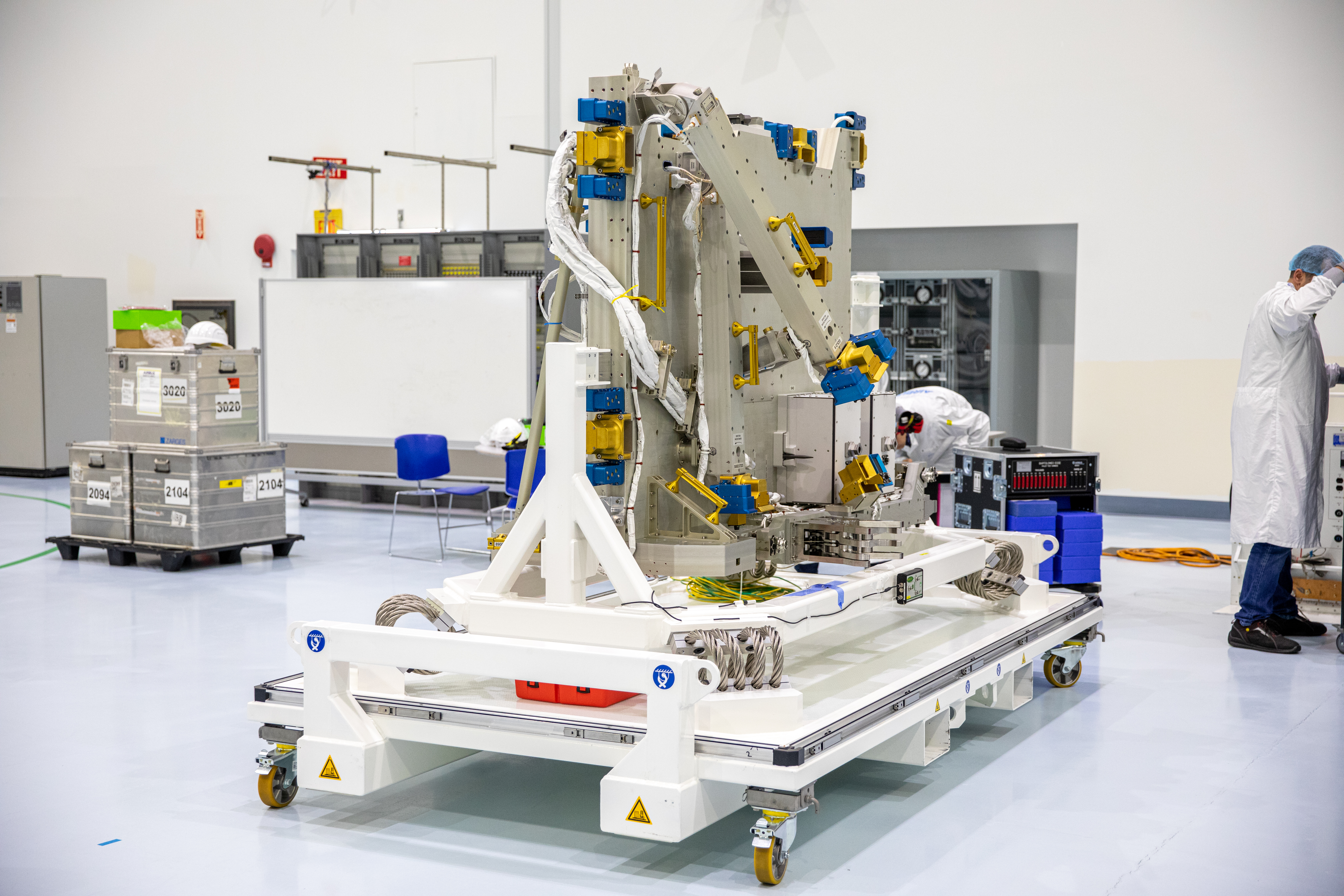
Airbus workers unpack the Bartolomeo platform in the Space Station Processing Facility high bay

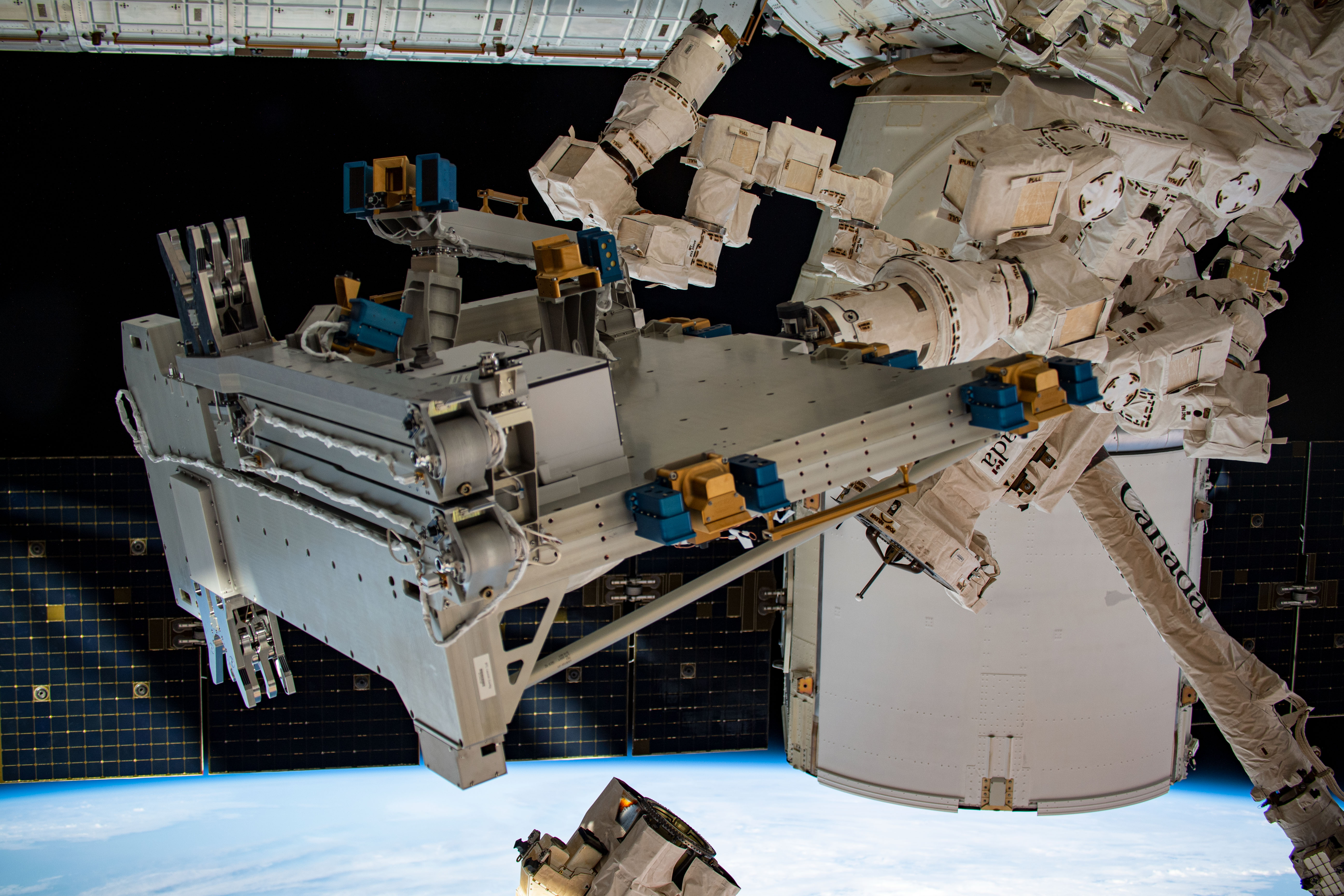
Bartolomeo in the grasp of Dextre manipulator during its installation on ISS in March 2020

The Bartolomeo platform, developed and operated by Airbus, is an additional external payload hosting platform that was connected to Columbus in 2020.

=== Background ===
Airbus spent about €40 million to develop the Bartolomeo platform, according to DLR, the German space agency. DLR says accommodations on Bartolomeo would be priced from €300,000 to €3.5 million per year. Data from attached experiments would be routed to the ground through the space station's telemetry system, then go into cloud storage, where scientists can access the information with a smartphone. Payload owners can also send commands to their experiments through a smartphone. Airbus is also partnering with the United Nations Office for Outer Space Affairs (UNOOSA) to solicit ideas for Bartolomeo payloads from around the world. Developing countries in particular are encouraged to participate. ESA is emphasizing the platform's usefulness for commercial entities, academic institutions, and other lower-budget customers.

=== Launch and installation ===
The Bartolomeo platform was robotically removed from SpaceX CRS-20's trunk and installed on the external forward side of Columbus module in April 2020, attached to the trunnions that held Columbus in the payload bay of Space Shuttle Atlantis on its 2008 launch. An EVA by ISS astronauts to connect power and communications cables and to install a new Ka-band antenna was carried out on January 27, 2021. Due to issues with the installation of Bartolomeo, only four out of the six cables could be installed. The platform was "partially operational and in a safe configuration" according to NASA. The final two cables were installed during a March 2022 spacewalk by ESA astronaut Matthias Maurer.

=== Use ===
In January 2025, a London-based company called Sen unveiled a high-resolution livestream from space via a camera hosted on the Bartolomeo platform. Their SpaceTV-1 package is a set of high definition 4K cameras that were delivered to the ISS on March, 2024. The livestream is available 20 hours per day on YouTube.

== External experiments on Columbus ==
Payloads are installed? onto Columbus using Flight Releasable Attachment Mechanisms or FRAMs for short. There are four FRAMs on Columbus.

=== Current ===
- FRAM 1 (top side): STP-H11
- FRAM 2 (side top pylon): STP-H10
- FRAM 3 (side bottom pylon): Atmosphere-Space Interaction Monitor (ASIM)
- FRAM 4 (bottom side): Atomic Clock Ensemble in Space (ACES) since April 25, 2025
- Bartolomeo Slot 1 (Top Side) Empty
- Bartolomeo Slot 2 (Bottom) ArgUS 1 Unit 2-1
- Bartolomeo Slot 3 (Top Side) Multi-Needle Langmuir Probe
- Bartolomeo Slot 4 (Bottom) Empty
- Bartolomeo Slot 5 (Side Top Pylon) ArgUS 1 Unit 1-1
- Bartolomeo Slot 6 (Side Bottom Pylon) Empty
- Bartolomeo Slot 7 (Starboard Pylon Top) Empty
- Bartolomeo Slot 8 (Starboard Pylon Bottom) Empty
- Bartolomeo Slot 9 (Port Pylon Top) Empty
- Bartolomeo Slot 10 Port Pylon Bottom) Empty

=== Deorbited ===
- LWAPA/MISSE 6
- EuTEF
- ISS-RapidScat
- SOLAR
- Space Debris Sensor (SDS)
- High Definition Earth Viewing cameras (HDEV)
- STP-H7

=== Awaiting launch ===
- EXPORT
- GEROS

== Related publications ==
- Persson J, Dettmann J. Columbus External Payload Facility – Architecture and Use. Conference and Exhibit on International Space Station Use, Cape Canaveral, FL. Oct 15–18; AIAA-2001-5068. 2001
- External Payloads Proposer’s Guide to the International Space Station. NASA, 2017
- Bartolomeo: New External Payload Platform on the International Space Station: Technical Briefing Part 2. Airbus, 2019

== See also ==
- Scientific research on the ISS
- List of European Space Agency programmes and missions
