= Thor experiment =

Experiment aimed to investigate electrical activity

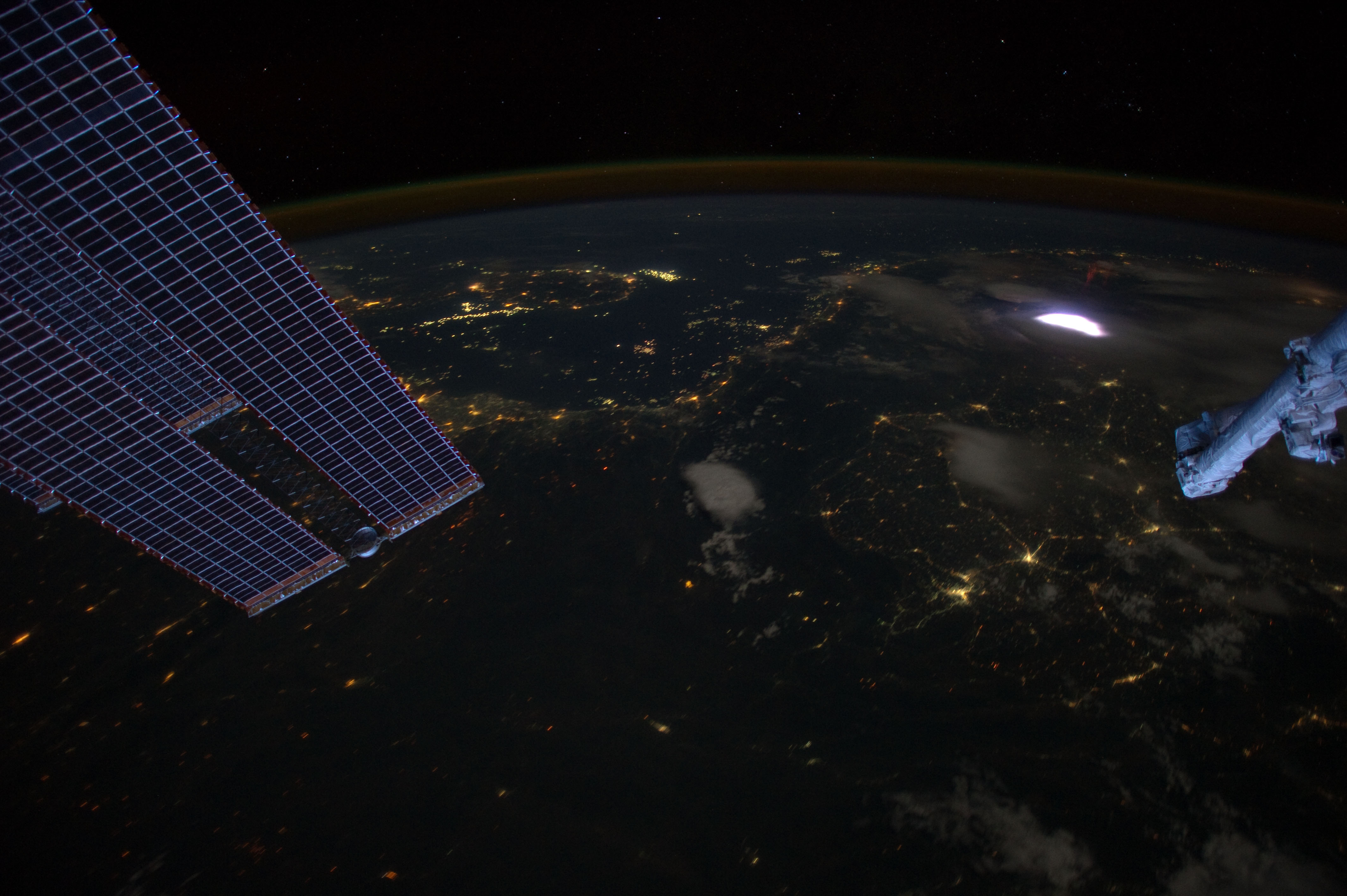
A sprite seen from the International Space Station.

The Thor experiment aims to investigate electrical activity from thunderstorms and convection related to water vapour transport. The experiment is named as 'Thor' after the god of thunder, lightning and storms in Nordic mythology. The experiment is conducted by European Space Agency with a thundercloud imaging system 400 km above Earth.

== Details ==
The project analyses electrical activity of thunderstorms by using optical cameras on the International Space Station, ground observations of lightning, and meteorological satellite observations of cloud properties. It is very difficult to capture some of the most violent electric discharges from the ground because the atmosphere blocks radiation. From International Space Station, it will be able to aim the camera, to zoom in and follow interesting regions as the Space Station passes by. The project was initiated by the Danish ESA-astronaut, Andreas Mogensen, and has already delivered valuable data for climate research.

More specifically, it studies about the transport of water from the troposphere to the stratosphere, and circulation of the stratosphere and mesosphere driven by internal gravity waves. Convective processes of the troposphere affect the transport of water vapour—a green house gas, and its circulation in both the stratosphere and mesosphere. By analysing the processes that occur in these layers, can improve atmospheric models, and provide a better understanding of Earth's climate and weather. The experiment also studies how much water the cloud turrets can carry into the stratosphere, and how lightning influences their formation.

Thor analyses red sprites, blue and gigantic jets from the Space Station over Earth at night. Sprites appear as luminous reddish-orange flashes and last 20 milliseconds at most. They often occur in clusters within atmosphere above the troposphere at an altitude range of 50–90 km (31–56 mi). They were first photographed on July 6, 1989, by scientists from the University of Minnesota and have subsequently been captured in video recordings many thousands of times. Even though these were discovered only 20 years ago, they hold the key to comprehend the Earth's electrical circuitry that give rise to the storms and currents that churn up the atmosphere.

Data from this experiment could improve the understanding how lightning activity powers cloud turrets, gravity waves, the structure of Transient Luminous Events above thunderstorms. According to Torsten Neubert, of Technical University of Denmark (DTU), the role of thunderstorms in our climate is significant, and Thor will help improve the predictions about the future climate and its consequences. ESA observes “that the blue discharges and jets are examples of a little-understood part of our atmosphere and the associated events have implications for how our atmosphere protects us from radiation." The images and detailed observations of the flashes were released to the public on January 9 in the journal Geophysical Research Letters.

The Thor experience will team up with the Atmosphere-Space Interaction Monitor (ASIM) experiment on a platform outside the Columbus module in 2017. The ASIM experiment will attempt to observe two ultraviolet optical bands, as well as the X- and gamma-rays, a first for the Space Station.

== See also ==
- Aurora (astronomy)
- Sprite (lightning)
- Catatumbo lightning
- Cosmic ray visual phenomena
- List of European Space Agency programs and missions
