= Columbus (ISS module) =

ESA science laboratory on the International Space Station

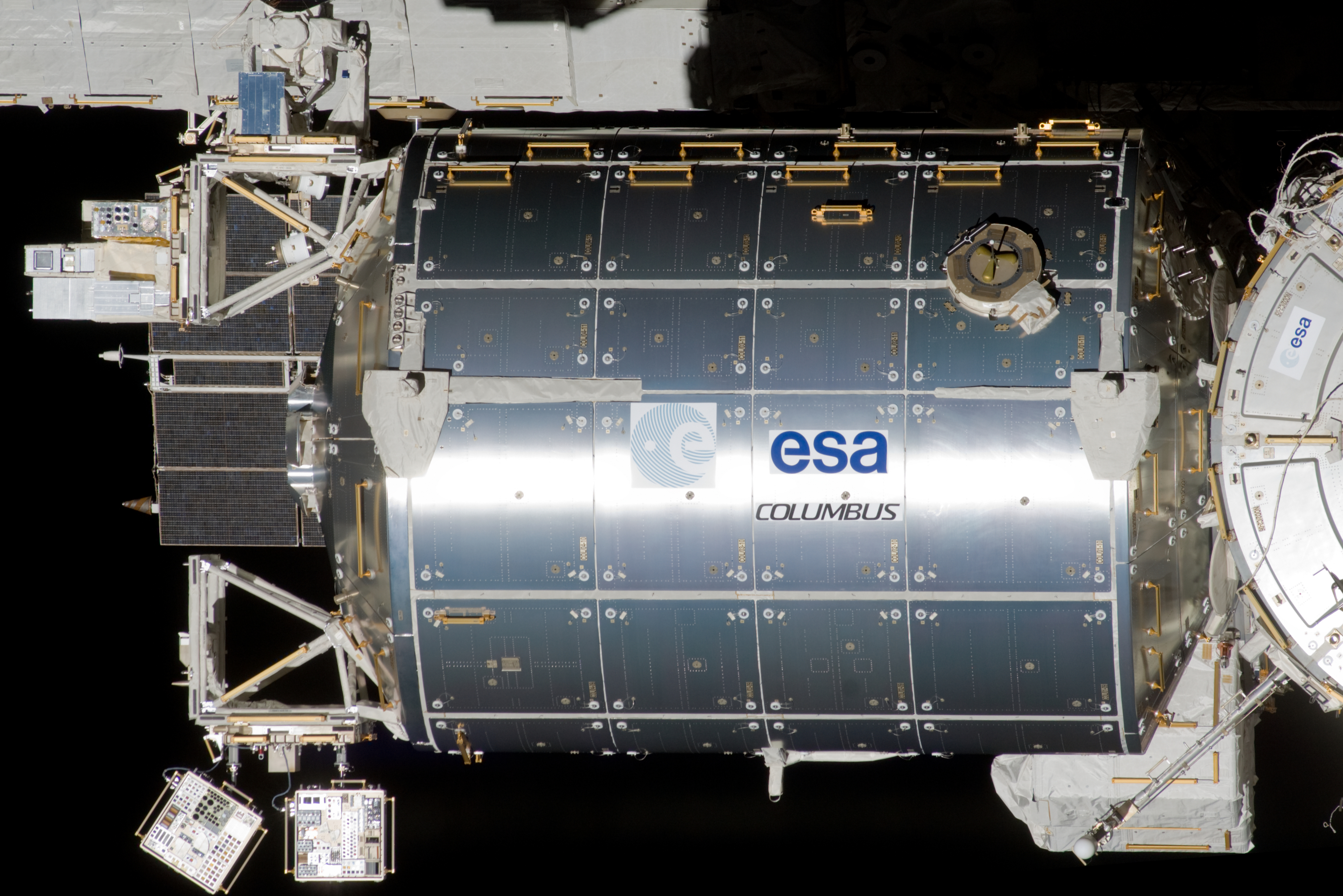
- Columbus as seen by Space Shuttle Endeavour on STS-127

Module statistics
- Part of: International Space Station
- Launch date: 7 February 2008, 19:45 UTC
- Launch vehicle: Space Shuttle Atlantis (STS-122)
- Berthed: 11 February 2008 (Harmony starboard)
- Mass: 10,300 kg (22,700 lb)
- Length: 6.9 m (23 ft)
- Diameter: 4.5 m (15 ft)

Columbus is a science laboratory module that forms part of the International Space Station (ISS) and represents the European Space Agency's (ESA) largest single contribution to the station. It was constructed in Turin, Italy, by Alcatel Alenia Space (now Thales Alenia Space) with functional equipment and software designed by EADS (now Airbus Defence and Space) in Bremen, Germany. The module was launched aboard Space Shuttle Atlantis on 7 February 2008, during mission STS-122. Columbus is operated by the Columbus Control Centre at the German Space Operations Center, part of the German Aerospace Center (DLR) in Oberpfaffenhofen near Munich. In 2008, ESA estimated the total cost of Columbus—including construction, ten years of operations, scientific experiments, and supporting ground infrastructure—at approximately €1.4 billion (about US$2 billion).

== History ==
The Columbus logo

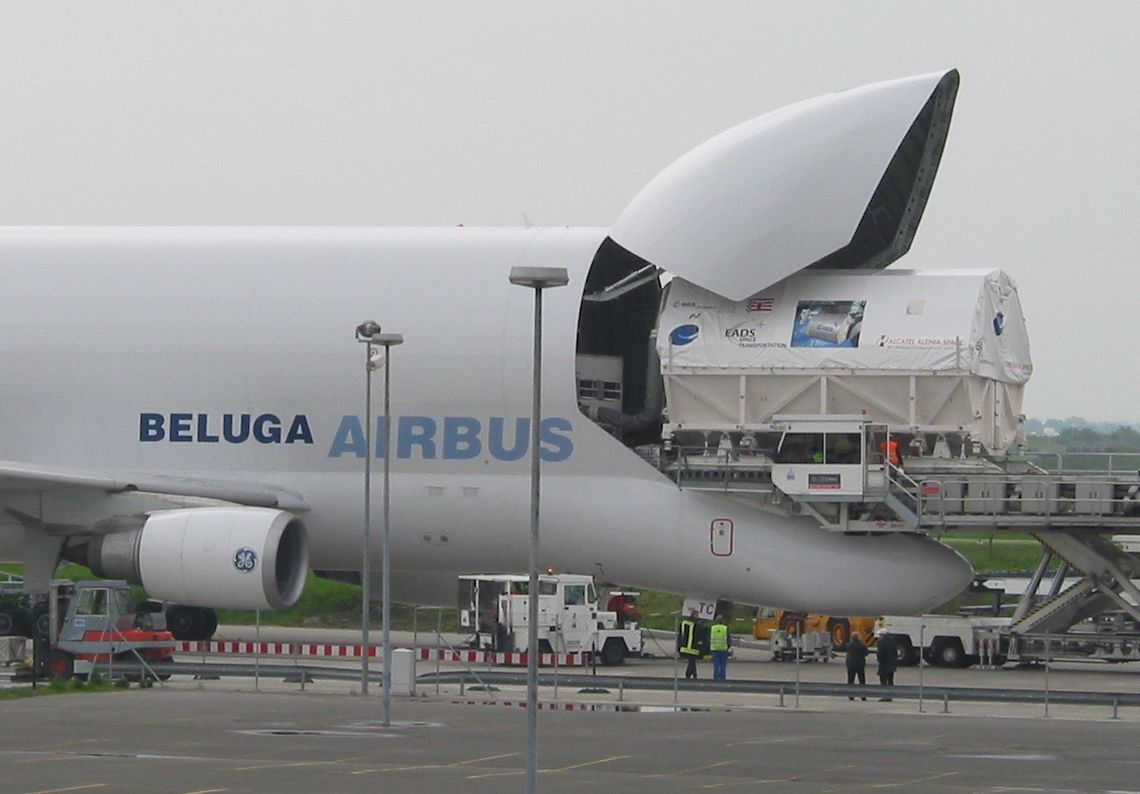
Columbus (inside a protective case) being loaded into an Airbus Beluga at the Bremen Airport

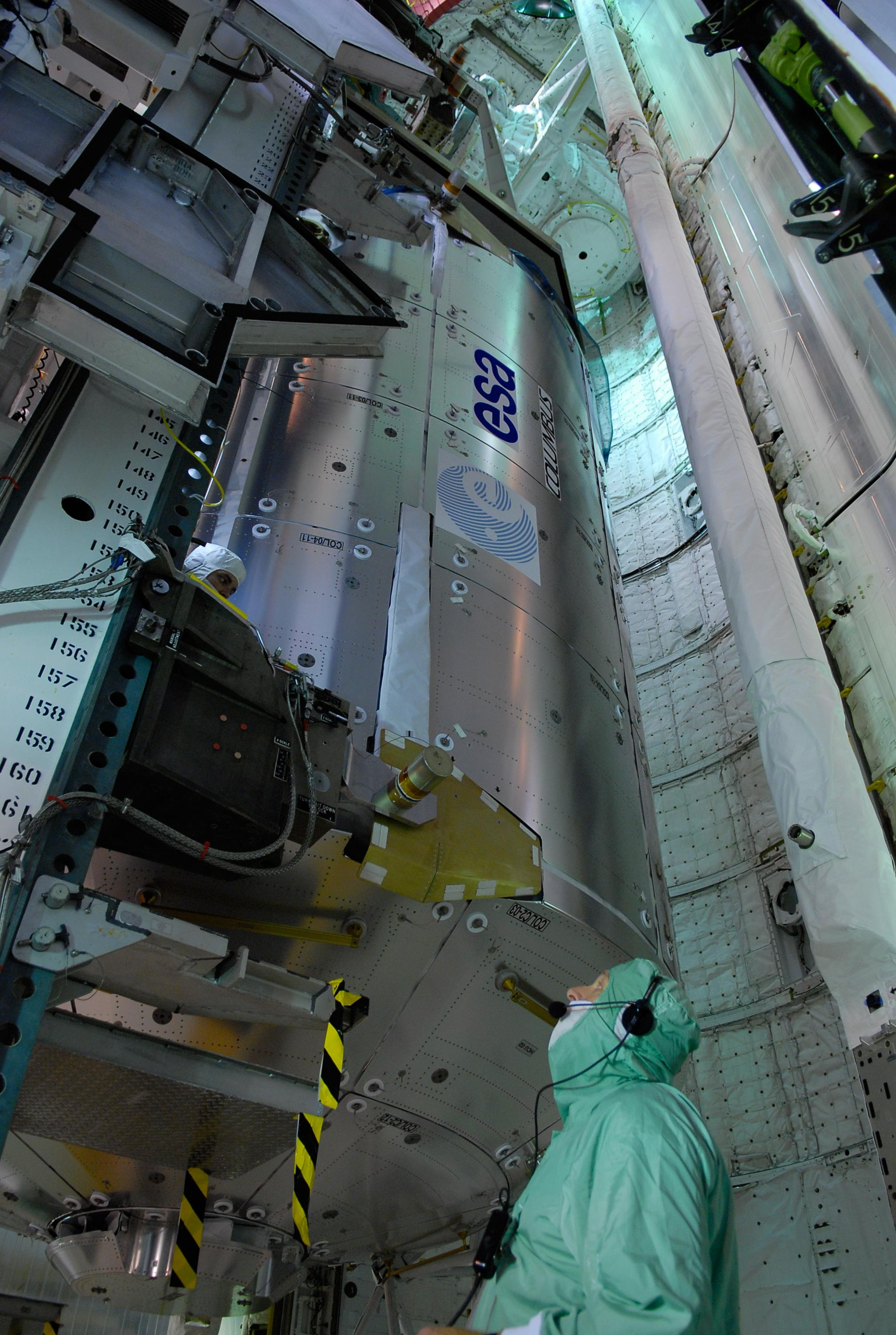
Columbus being loaded into Atlantis's payload bay in preparation for launch

=== Background ===
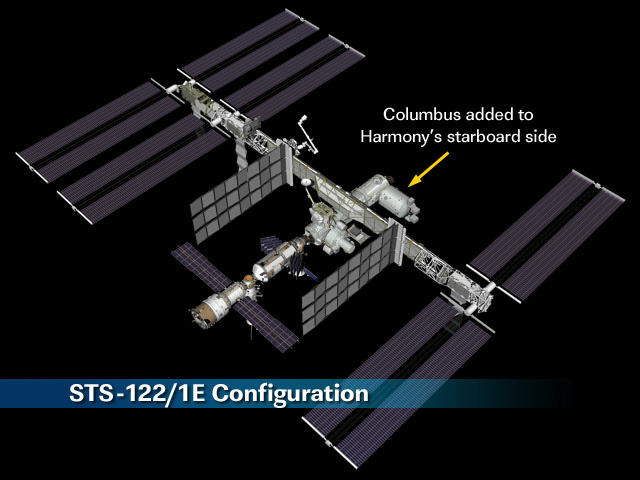
Columbus's position on the ISS

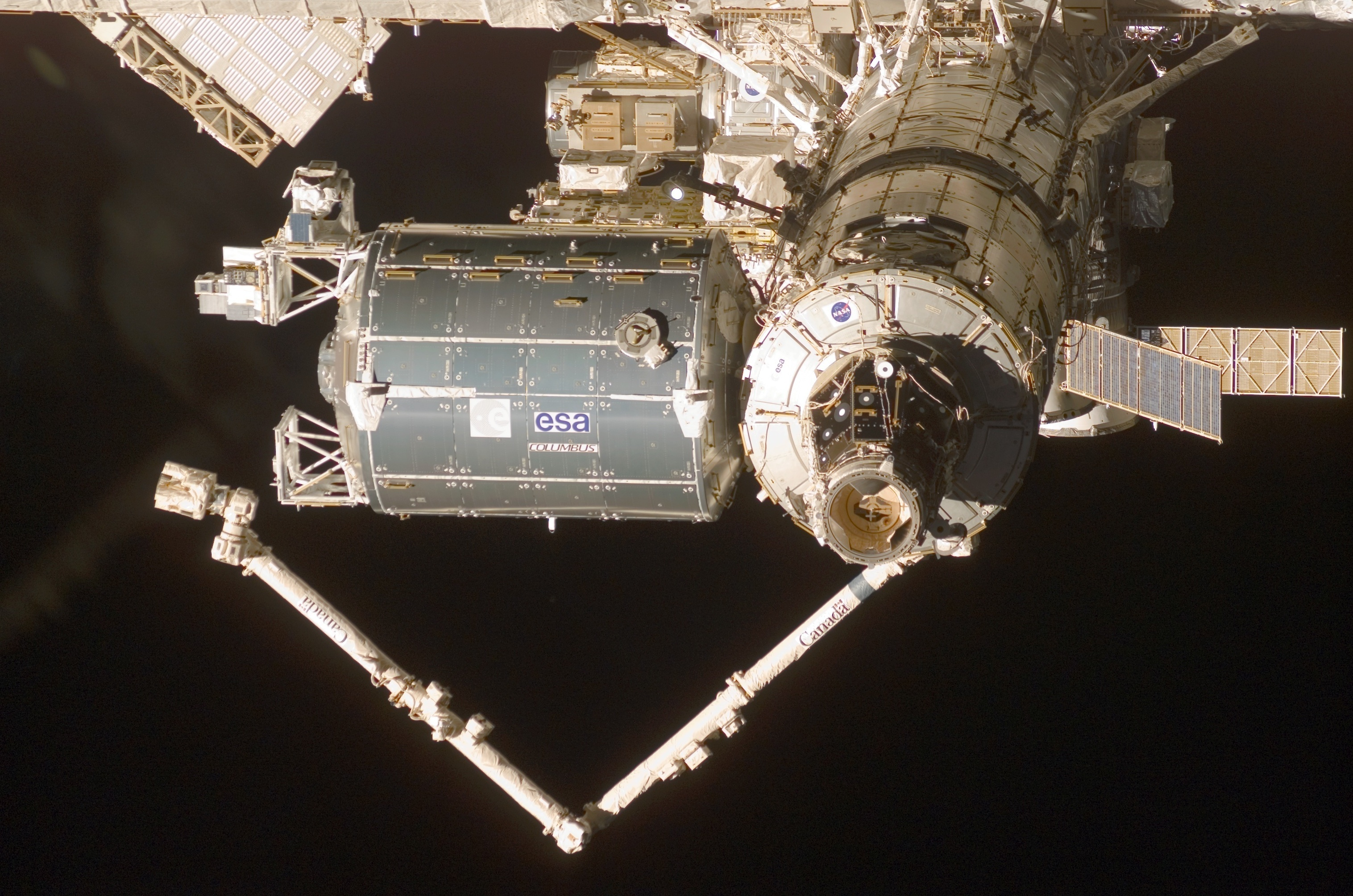
Columbus docked to the starboard side of Harmony

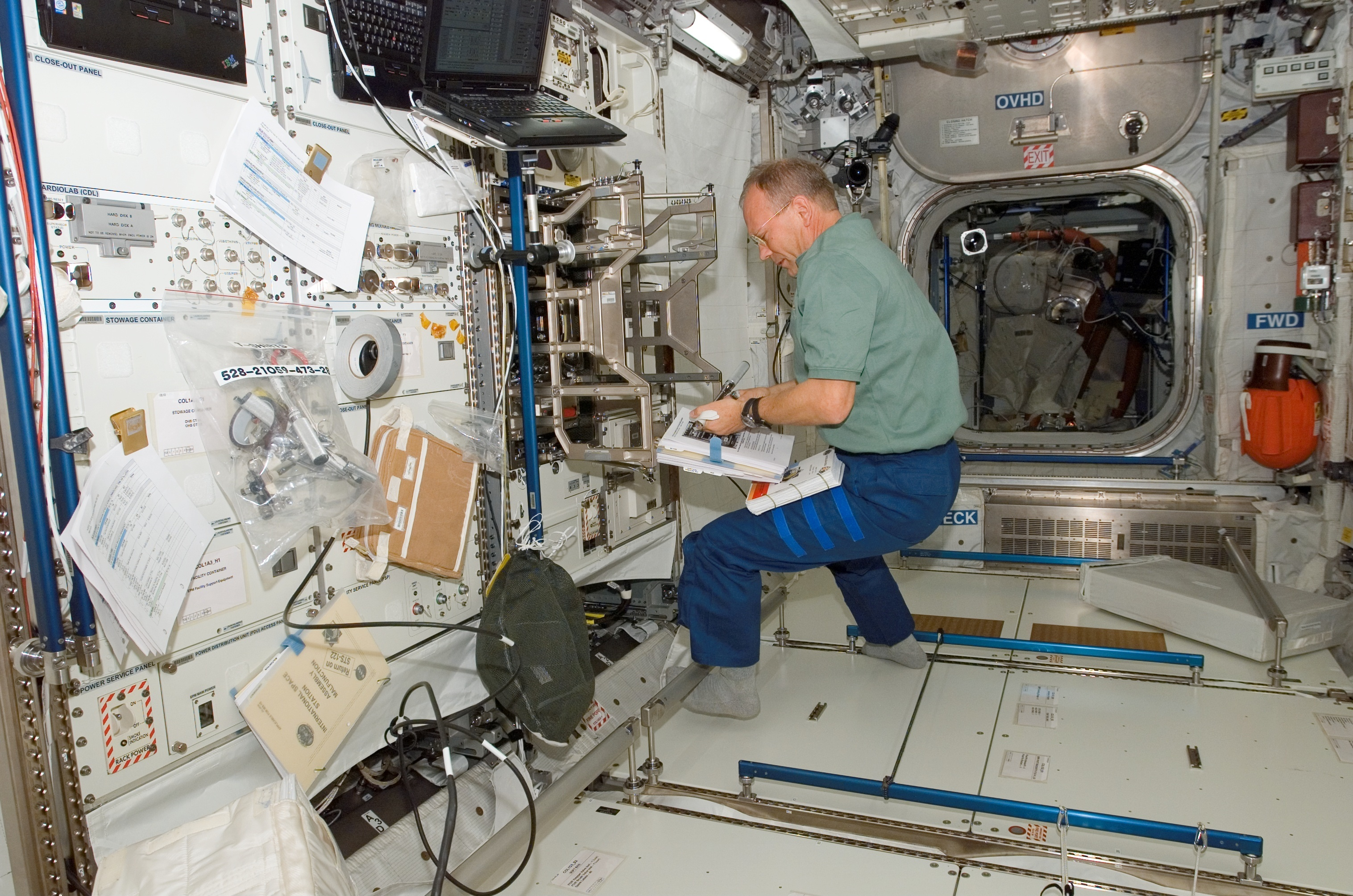
Hans Schlegel working on outfitting Columbus

The structure used for Columbus is based on the MPLM module built for NASA by Thales Alenia Space. In 2000 the pre-integrated module (structure including harness and tubing) was delivered to Bremen in Germany by the Co-prime contractor Alenia. The final integration and system testing was performed by the overall prime contractor EADS Astrium Space Transportation, after that the initial Payload was integrated and the overall complement checked-out.

The final schedule was much longer than originally planned due to development problems (several caused by the complex responsibility splitting between the Co-prime and the Overall prime contractor) and design changes introduced by ESA but also due to the Shuttle problems delaying the Columbus launch for several years. The main design change was the addition of the External Payload Facility (EPF), which was driven by the different European Payload organizations being more interested in outer space than internal experiments. Also the addition of a terminal for direct communications to/from ground, which could have been used also as back-up for the ISS system, was studied but not implemented for cost reasons.

=== Construction ===
ESA chose EADS Astrium Space Transportation as prime contractor for Columbus overall design, verification and integration. The Columbus structure, the micro-meteorite protection system, the active and passive thermal control, the environmental control, the harness and all the related ground support equipment were designed and qualified by Alcatel Alenia Space in Turin, Italy as defined by the PICA – Principle (for definition see History below); the related hardware was pre-integrated and sent as PICA in September 2001 to Bremen. The lab was built and qualified on system level at the EADS Astrium Space Transportation facilities in Bremen, Germany.

=== Launch campaign ===
Columbus was launched under the ESA–NASA ISS bartering system. Under this arrangement, the ESA agreed to provide NASA with the fully integrated Harmony and Tranquility node modules, along with additional equipment and parts, in exchange for the launch of Columbus and its initial payload aboard the Space Shuttle. This barter allowed ESA to secure launch services without a direct financial transaction, and enabling those funds to remain within ESA member states.

On 27 May 2006 Columbus was flown from Bremen to the Space Station Processing Facility (SSPF) at the Kennedy Space Center on board an Airbus Beluga oversized cargo aircraft. In November 2007, Columbus was moved out of the SSPF and loaded into the payload bay of the Atlantis orbiter for launch on ISS assembly flight 1E (STS-122).

During cryo-filling of the Space Shuttle External Tank (ET) with liquid hydrogen and liquid oxygen prior to the first launch attempt on 6 December 2007, two of four liquid hydrogen engine cutoff sensors failed a test. As a result of the failure, the launch was postponeded, initially for 24 hours. This was later revised into a 72-hour delay, resulting in a next launch attempt set for Sunday, 9 December 2007. This launch attempt was scrubbed when one of the ECO sensors again failed during fuelling. The ECO sensors' external connector was changed on the Space Shuttle external tank, causing a two-month delay in the launch. Columbus was finally launched successfully on the third attempt at 2:45pm EST, 7 February 2008.

=== Berthing ===
Once in space, the station's Canadarm2 removed Columbus from the docked shuttle's cargo bay and attached it to the starboard berth of Harmony on 11 February 2008.

== Description ==
The laboratory is a cylindrical module, made from stainless steel, kevlar and hardened aluminum, with two end cones. It is 4.477 m (14 ft 8.3 in) in external diameter and 6.871 m (22 ft 6.5 in) in overall length, excluding the projecting external experiment racks. Its shape is very similar to that of the Multi-Purpose Logistics Modules (MPLMs), since both were designed to fit in the cargo bay of a Space Shuttle orbiter. The starboard end cone contains most of the laboratory's on-board computers. The port end cone contains the Common Berthing Mechanism.

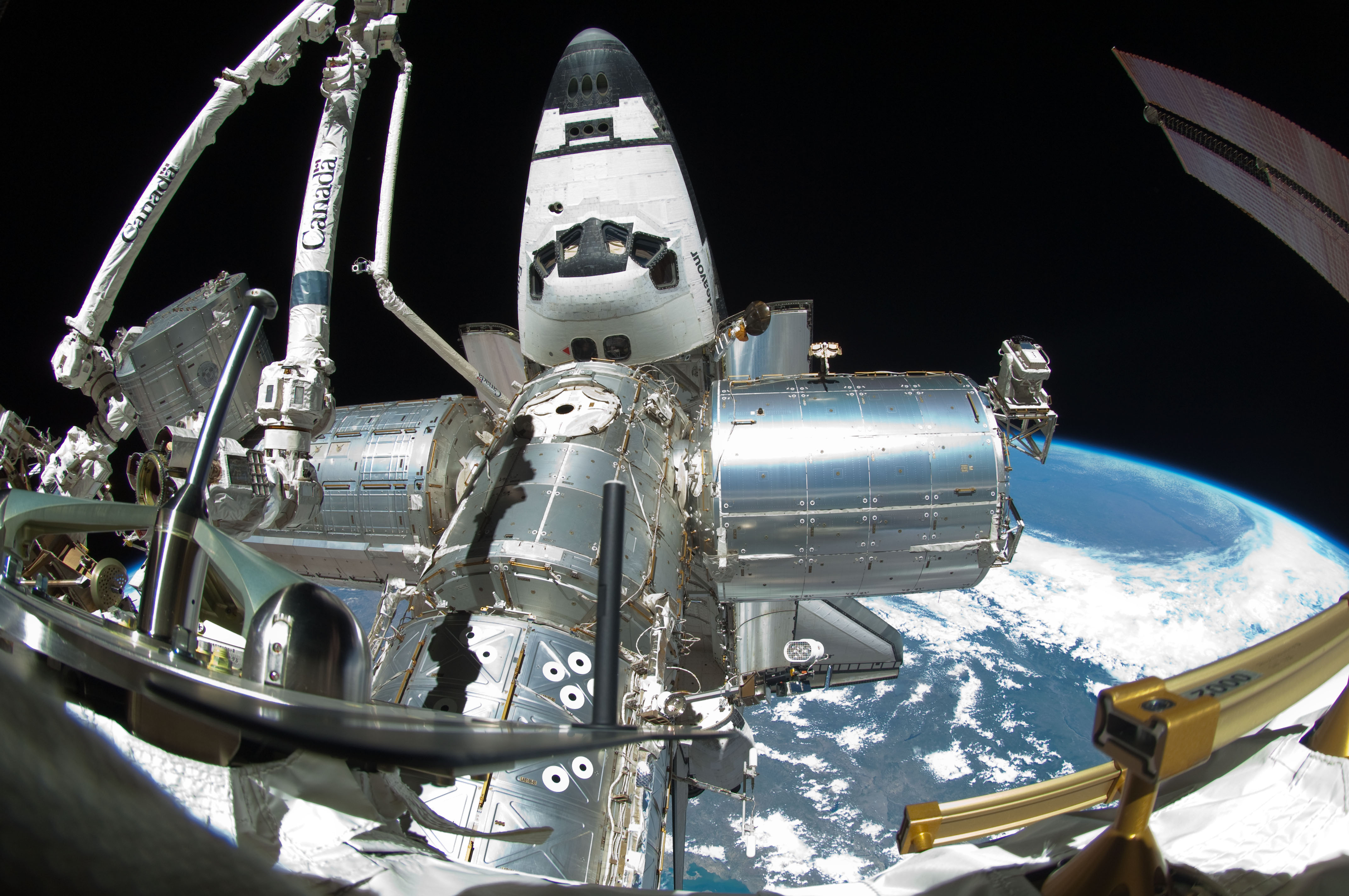
Columbus module (right) pictured with the Space Shuttle Endeavour in May 2011

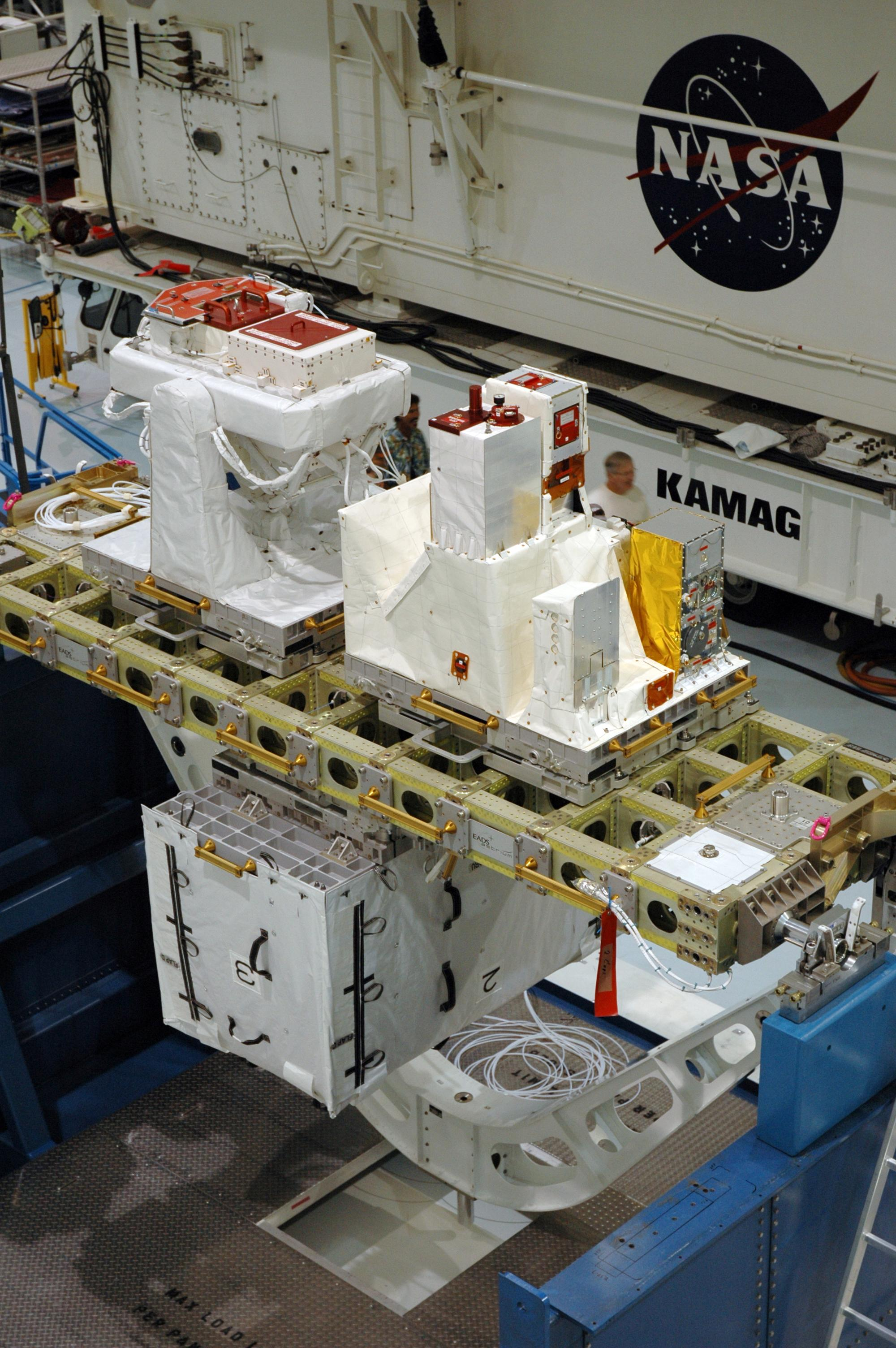
External payloads SOLAR and EuTEF installed on LCC-lite cargo carrier prior to launch on shuttle mission STS-122

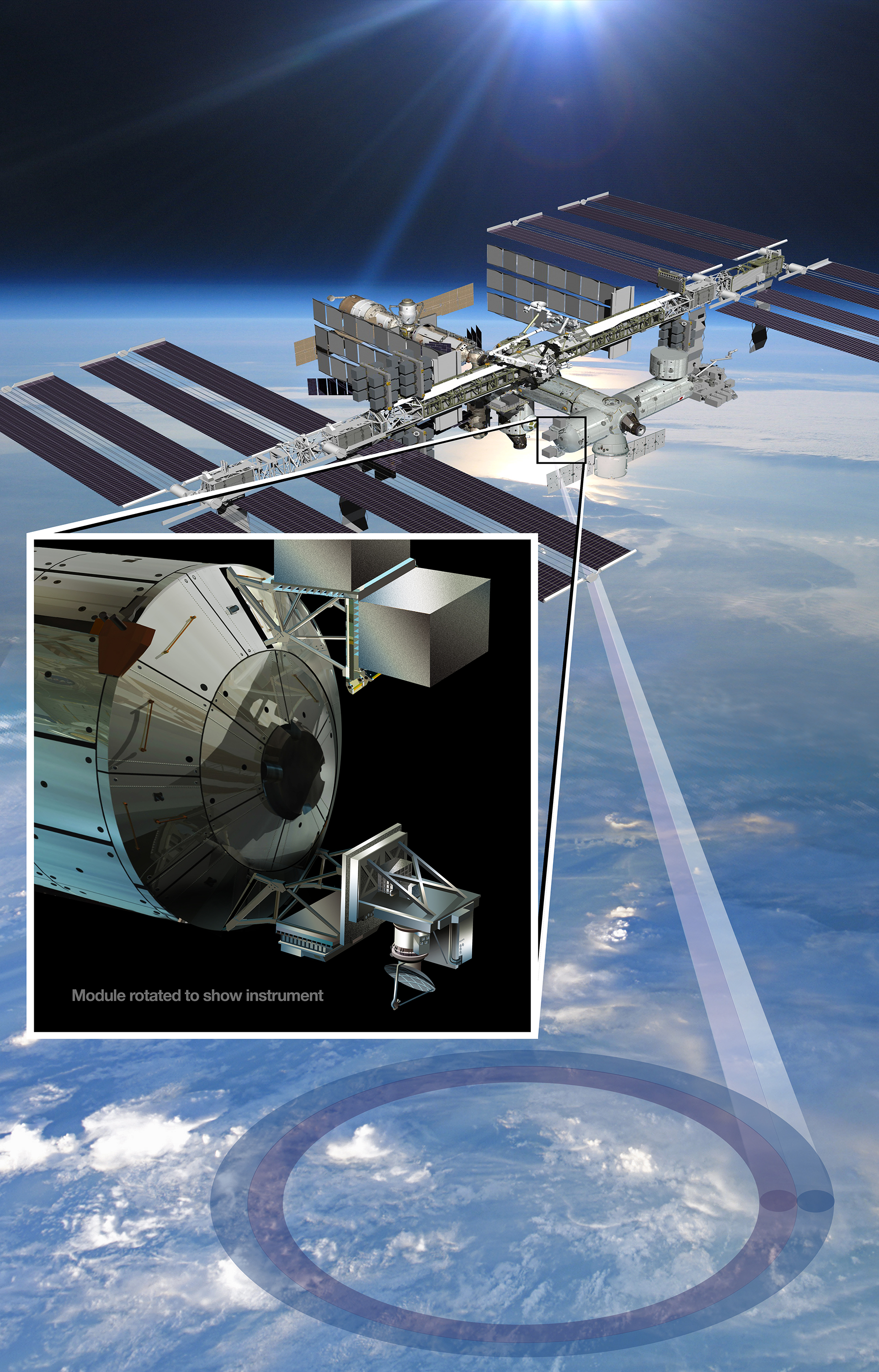
One instrument mounted on Columbus was ISS-RapidScat, and this graphic shows the location of Columbus and where that instrument was mounted on the Module. The instrument was installed in 2014 and operated until 2016.

- Length: 7 m (23 ft)
- Diameter: 4.5 m (15 ft)
- Total mass: 10,300 kg (22,708 lb)
- Total payload mass 2,500 kg (5,512 lb)
- Total on-orbit mass 12,800 kg (28,219 lb)
- Construction details:
  - Wall thickness 4mm
  - welded end cones
  - materials : Stainless steel, kevlar, aluminium

== Research activities and payloads ==
Activities in the lab are controlled on the ground by the Columbus Control Center (at DLR Oberpfaffenhofen in Germany) and by the associated User Support Operations Centres throughout Europe.

The laboratory can accommodate ten active International Standard Payload Racks (ISPRs) for science payloads. Agreements with NASA allocate to ESA 51% usage of the Columbus Laboratory. ESA is thus allocated five active rack locations, with the other five being allocated to NASA. Four active rack locations are on the forward side of the deck, four on the aft side, and two are in overhead locations. Three of the deck racks are filled with life support and cooling systems. The remaining deck rack and the two remaining overhead racks are storage racks.

The following European ISPRs have been initially installed inside Columbus:

- Fluid Science Laboratory (FSL)
- European Physiology Modules (EPM)
- Biolab
- European Drawer Rack (EDR)
- European Drawer Rack Mark II (EDR2)
- European Stowage Rack

In addition, four un-pressurized payload platforms can be attached outside the starboard cone, on the Columbus External Payload Facility (CEPF). Each external payload is mounted on an adaptor able to accommodate small instruments and experiments totalling up to 230 kilograms (507 lb). The first external payloads were mounted on Columbus by crew members of the mission STS-122 mission. Some of the external payloads are:

- European Technology Exposure Facility (EuTEF) platform, which accommodates nine instruments: TRIBOLAB, PLEGPAY, MEDET, EUFIDE, DEBIE-2, FIPEX, EUTEMP, EXPOSE, DOSTEL, and the Earth Viewing Camera.
- Solar Monitoring Observatory (SOLAR)
- MISSE-6 (NASA payload)
- In 2014 the ISS-RapidScat instrument was installed, which was operated until late 2016. ISS-RapidScat was transported to ISS by the SpaceX CRS-4 spaceflight.
- Atmosphere-Space Interaction Monitor (ASIM), installed April 2018
- Atomic Clock Ensemble in Space (ACES), installed April 2025
- Columbus Ka-band Terminal (COLKa), a communications terminal utilizing the European Data Relay System (EDRS), installed January 2021

Planned additional external payloads:

- EXPORT

In 2026, the open-source virtualization platform Proxmox VE is scheduled to be deployed within the Columbus module.

== See also ==
- List of European Space Agency programmes and missions
- European Transportation Carrier (ISS Facility) (ETC)
- Columbus – External Payload Facility (Columbus-EPF)
- Bartolomeo facility
