= Atomic Clock Ensemble in Space =

Experiment

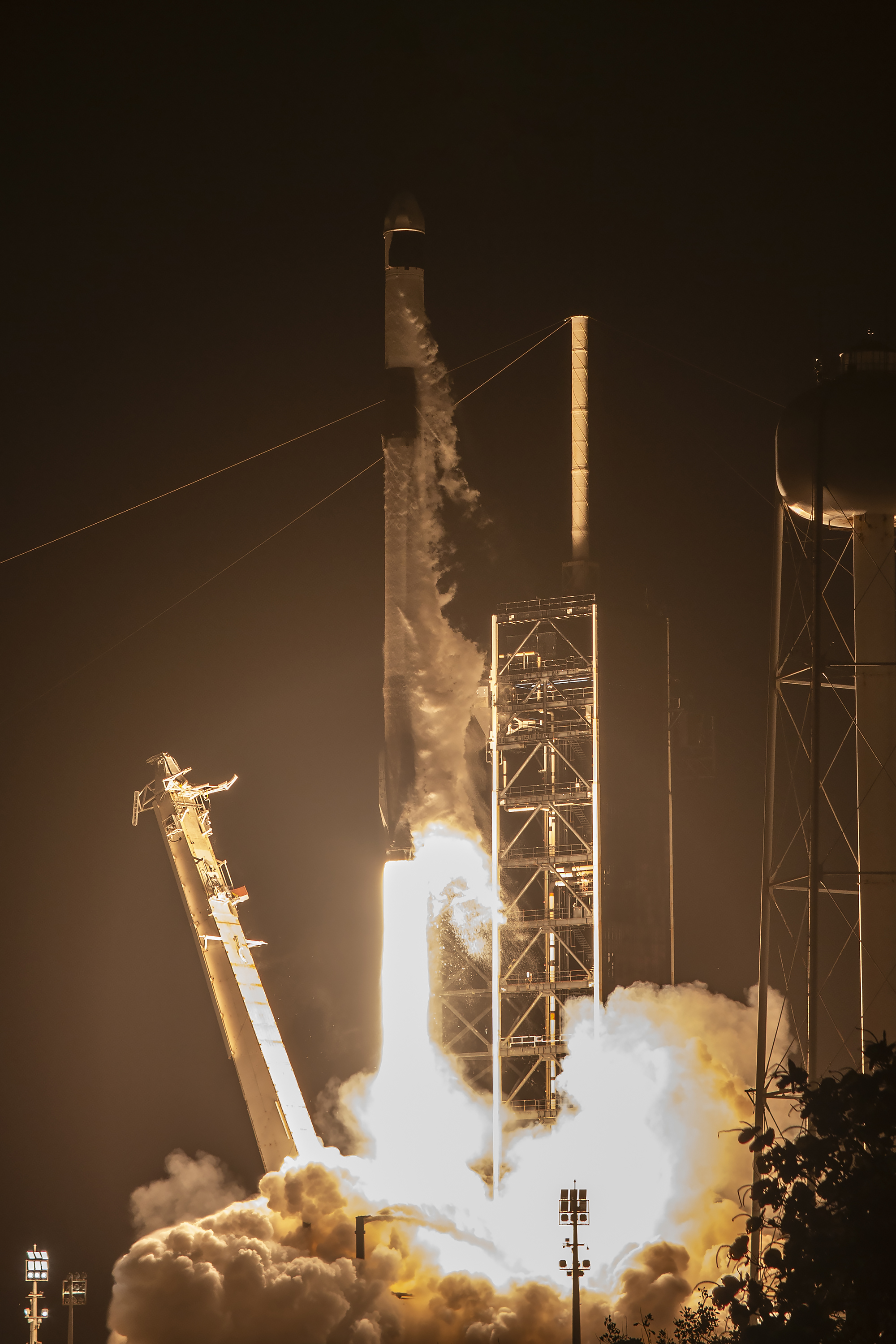
Launch of the Falcon 9 rocket with the CRS-32 Cargo Dragon capsule carrying ACES to the International Space Station

The Atomic Clock Ensemble in Space (ACES) is a project led by the European Space Agency (ESA), placing ultra-stable atomic clocks on the International Space Station (ISS). It was launched and installed on the Columbus External Payload Facility in April 2025. Operation in the microgravity environment of the ISS provides a stable and accurate time base for different areas of research, including general relativity and string theory tests, time and frequency metrology, and very long baseline interferometry.

== Instruments ==
The payload contains two clocks: a caesium laser cooled atomic clock (PHARAO) developed by CNES, France for long-term stability and an active hydrogen maser (SHM) developed by Spectratime, Switzerland for short-term stability. The onboard frequency comparison between PHARAO and SHM will be a key element for the evaluation of the accuracy and the short/medium-term stability of the PHARAO clock, it will allow the identification of the optimal operating conditions for PHARAO and to select a compromise between frequency accuracy and stability. The mission will also be a test-bed for the space qualification of the active hydrogen maser SHM. Afterwards, optimisation performances in the 2 × 10^{−16} range for both frequency instability and inaccuracy are intended, this corresponds to a time error of about 1 second over 300 million years.

== Timeline ==
- After earlier plans for launch readiness in 2012, the clock ensemble was expected to travel to the space station aboard a Falcon 9 in 2021. Major delays due to difficulties in the development and testing of the active hydrogen maser and the time transfer microwave system extended the launch to 2025
- ACES was launched to the ISS on 21 April 2025 on a SpaceX Falcon 9 rocket
- On April 25, 2025, ACES was installed on the Earth-facing side of ESA’s Columbus laboratory module using the Canadian robotic arm. A six-month commissioning phase will follow
- The first activation of ACES, which will establish communications with ground control and stabilise thermal systems, is scheduled for 28 April
- ESA expects a 30-month operations phase for ACES

== See also ==
- Scientific research on the ISS
- Columbus External Payload Facility
- European contribution to the International Space Station
- List of European Space Agency programmes and missions
