= SOLAR (ISS) =

ESA science observatory on the Columbus Laboratory

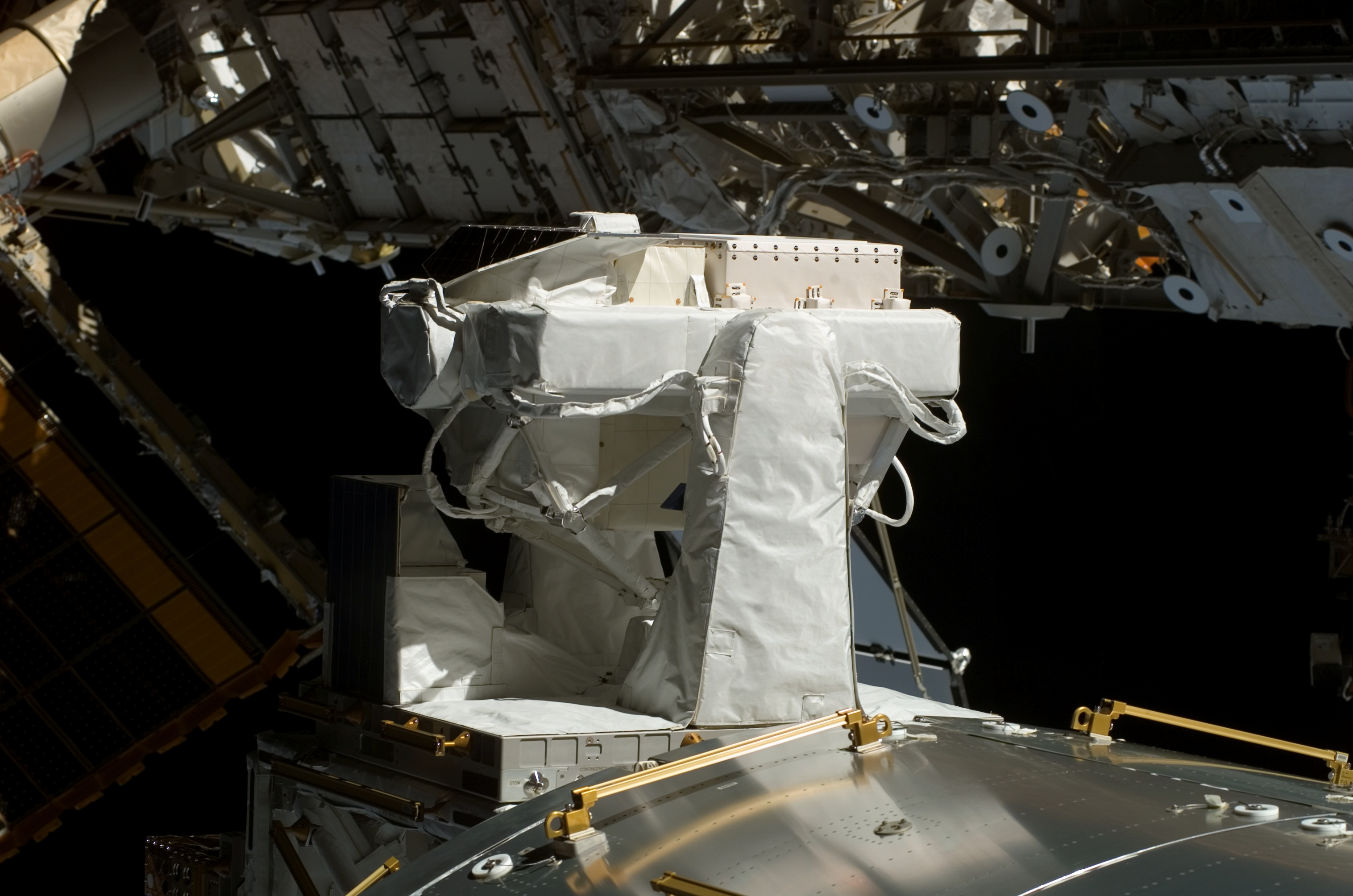
SOLAR

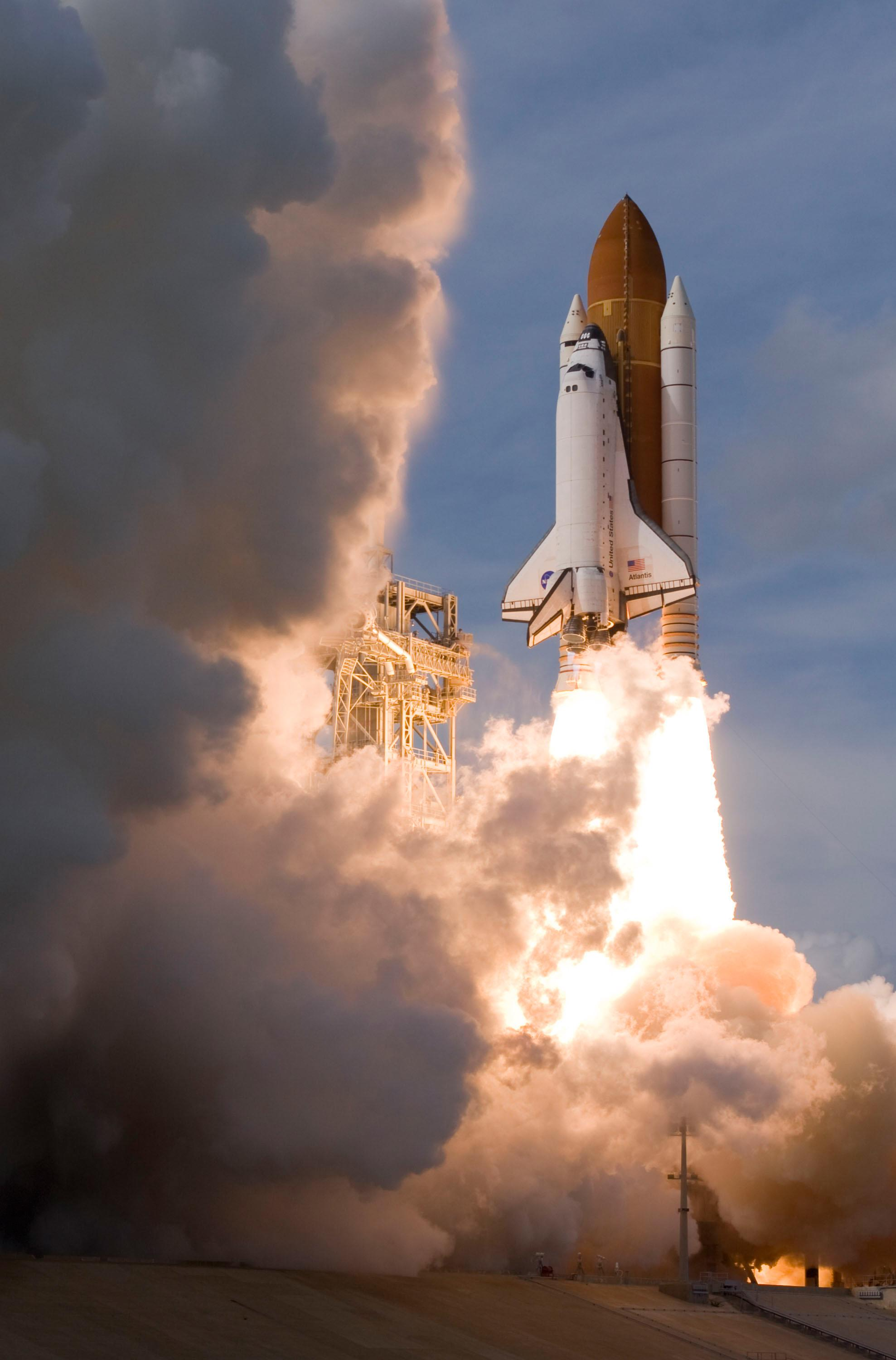
SOLAR heads into orbit on STS-122

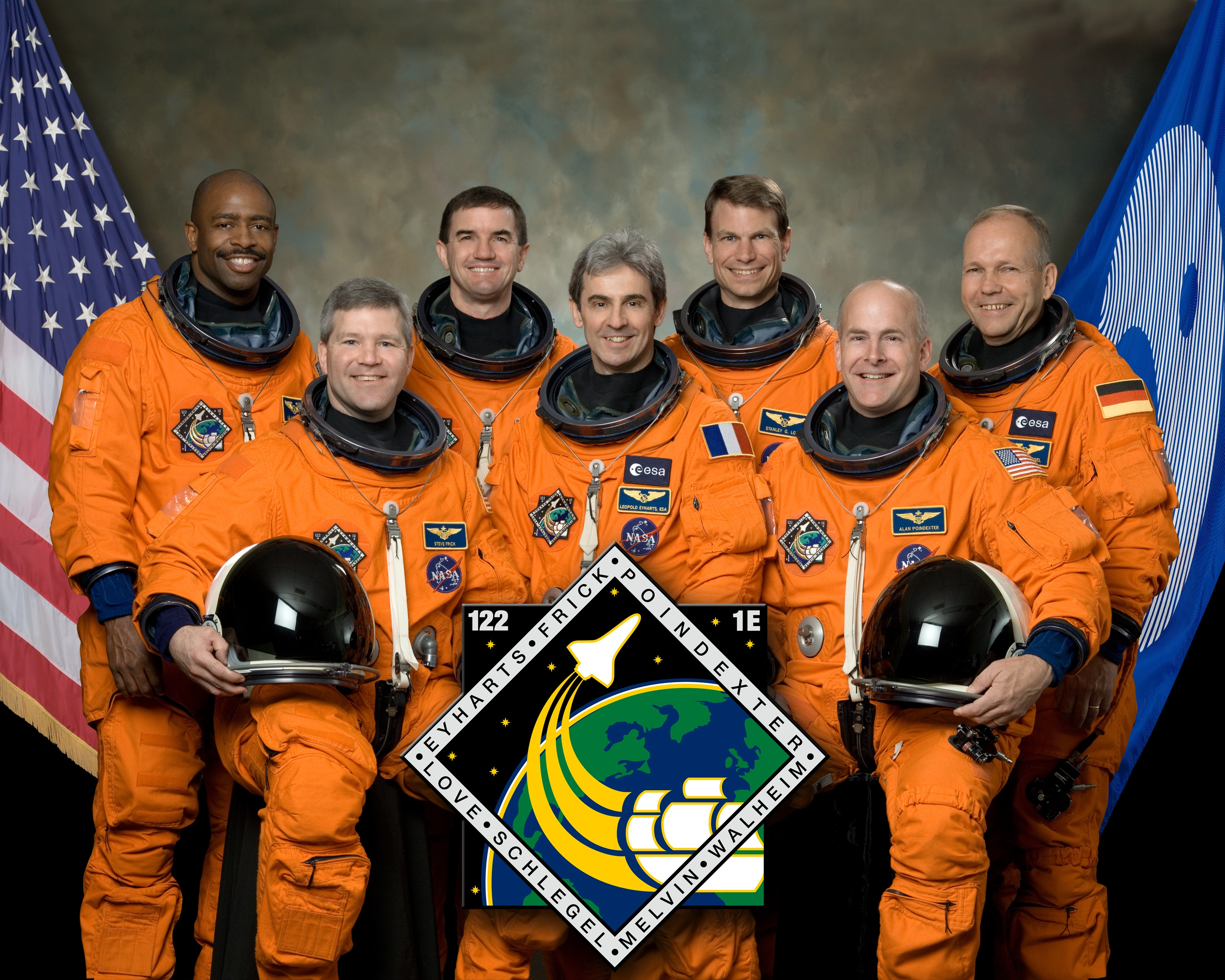
The STS-122 crew included two ESA astronauts, Léopold Eyharts (fr) and Hans Schlegel (de)

SOLAR (Solar Monitoring Observatory) was an ESA science observatory on the Columbus Laboratory, which is part of the International Space Station. SOLAR was launched with Columbus in February 2008 aboard STS-122. It was externally mounted to Columbus with the European Technology Exposure Facility (EuTEF). SOLAR has three main space science instruments: SOVIM, SOLSPEC and SOL-ACES. Together they provide detailed measurements of the Sun's spectral irradiance. The SOLAR platform and its instruments are controlled from the Belgian User Support and Operations Centre (B.USOC), located at the Belgian Institute for Space Aeronomy (BISA) in Uccle, Belgium.

== Instruments ==
- SOVIM (Solar Variability and Irradiance Monitor) instrument is based on an earlier instrument (SOVA) which flew aboard the European Retrievable Carrier, launched on STS-46 in 1992. It is designed to measure solar radiation with wavelengths from 200 nanometers - 100 micrometers. This covers near-ultraviolet, visible and infrared areas of the spectrum.
- SOLSPEC (Solar Spectral irradiance measurements) is designed to measure the solar spectral irradiance in the 165- to 3000-nanometer range with high spectral resolution.
- SOL-ACES (Auto-calibrating Extreme Ultraviolet and Ultraviolet spectrometers) consists of four grazing incidence grating spectrometers. They are designed to measure the EUV/UV spectral regime (17 nanometers - 220 nanometers) with moderate spectral resolution.

== Mission ==
The mission was originally planned for a 2003 launch, but was delayed following the Space Shuttle Columbia disaster.

In 2012, the entire 450-tonne station was rotated so SOLAR could observe a full rotation of the Sun continuously. A Solar rotation takes about 24–28 days depending on the latitude.

SOLAR's mission ended in 2017 with the failure of all but one of its instruments. On the morning of 28 January 2020 SOLAR was removed from FRAM 1 where it rested since it was delivered on STS 122 and strapped to the side of Cygnus NG-12 with the SDS placed on the other side. SOLAR was released from the station on 3 February 2020 and burnt up in the atmosphere over the Pacific Ocean on 13 March 2020 ending the mission which spent a decade photographing the sun.

== Visuals ==
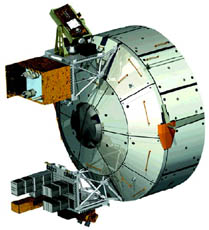
The Solar Monitoring Observatory is externally mounted on the Columbus Laboratory

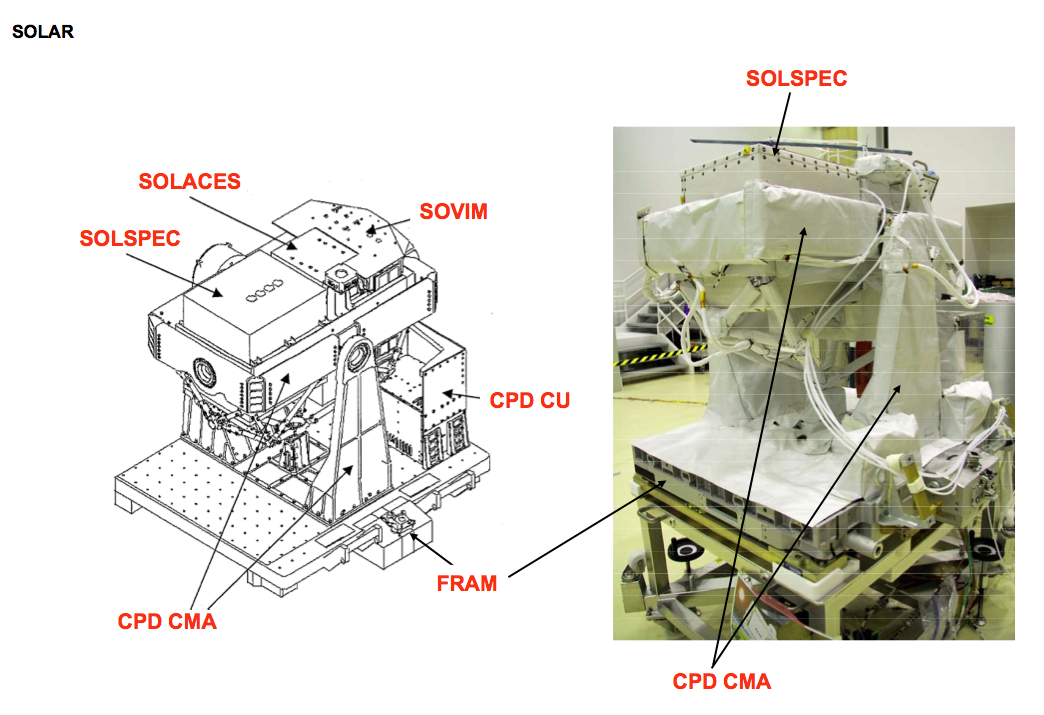
SOLAR

== See also ==
- Scientific research on the ISS
- Spectroscopy
