= Columbus Control Centre =

Mission control center of German Aerospace Center for the Columbus module of the ISS

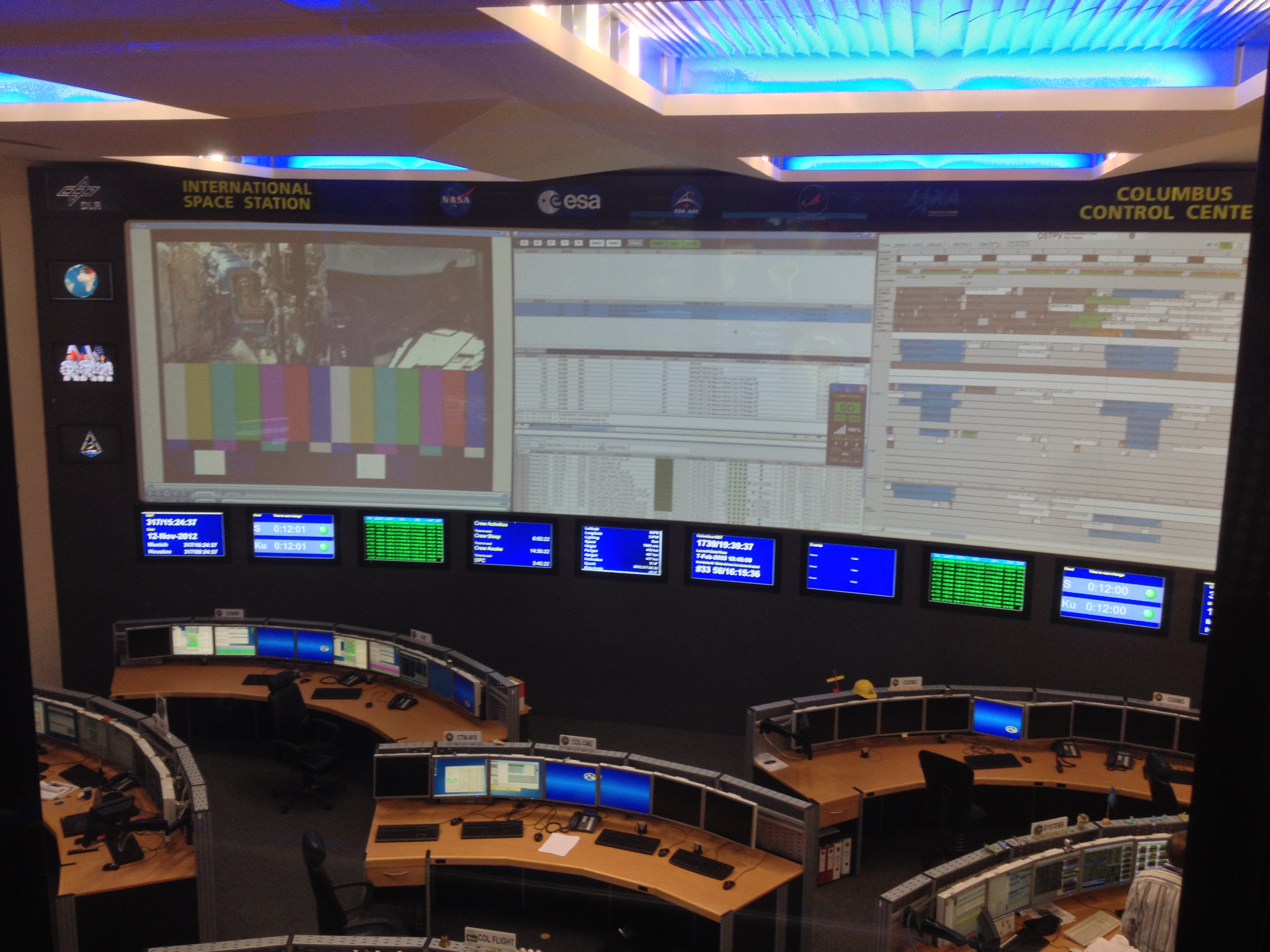
Interior of the Columbus Control Centre

The Columbus Control Centre also known by its radio callsign, Mission Control Munich, is the mission control centre which is used to control the Columbus research laboratory, which is part of the International Space Station (ISS). The control centre is located at the German Aerospace Center (DLR) facility in Oberpfaffenhofen near Munich, Germany. The centre is operated by the DLR, under contract from the European Space Agency (ESA).

The Columbus Control Centre entered full-time operation during the STS-122 Shuttle Mission, which delivered the Columbus module to the ISS. The module was attached to the ISS on 11 February 2008.

== Identification and call sign ==
The Columbus Control Centre is known by the acronym COL-CC. The crew on board the International Space Station use the call sign 'Munich' when calling down to COL-CC.

== Flight Control Room positions ==
The Col-CC Flight Control Room is permanently staffed by three full times positions, COL FLIGHT, STRATOS (Safeguarding Thermal Resources Avionics Telecommunications Operations Systems), and GC. These are supported by COMET during the day 7 days a week as well as EUROCOM and COSMO during crew wake times, Monday to Friday. COL FLIGHT is responsible for real time Columbus Operations and reports to ISS FLIGHT at MCC-H. COMET (formerly COL OC (Operations Coordinator)) coordinates Payload operations and real time planning as part of the EPIC team. STRATOS controls the onboard power, thermal and environmental subsystems plus the onboard data, video and communication subsystems, as well as payload interfaces . EUROCOM is the interface to the International Space Station crew, communicating over the space to ground loops. COSMO (COlumbus Stowage and Maintenance Officer) is responsible for inventory management, on-orbit maintenance and Plug in Plan.

== Support to USOCs and ATV missions ==
The Columbus Control Centre is also responsible for providing the Ground Segment Services for all European crewed space flight activities. This includes connecting the User Support Operations Centres (USOCs) with the Columbus Control Centre, and routing data for the Automated Transfer Vehicles (ATVs) to the ATV Control Centre located in Toulouse. ESA will use the ATVs to bring supplies and future science experiments to the ISS. The Columbus Control Centre, "will supervise the ISS-based tasks of the uncrewed European space transporter ATV."

== See also ==
- European Space Operations Centre
