= Atmosphere-Space Interactions Monitor =

ISS-based upper-atmospheric lightning observation project

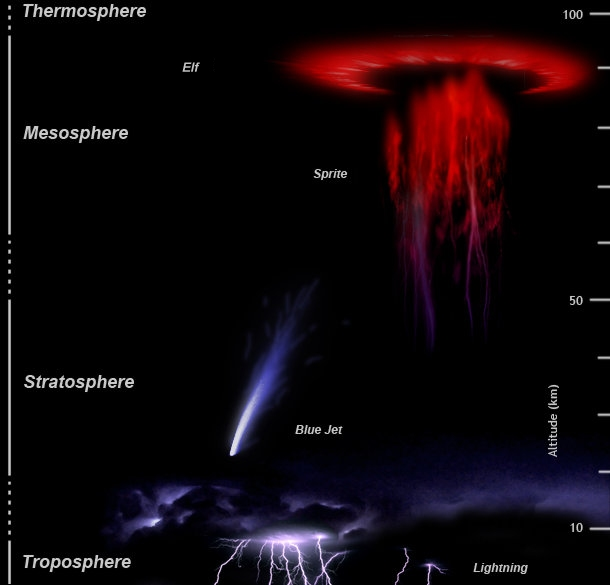
Representation of upper-atmospheric lightning and electrical-discharge phenomena

Atmosphere-Space Interactions Monitor (ASIM) is a project led by the European Space Agency to place cameras and X-ray/γ-ray detectors on the International Space Station to observe the upper atmosphere in order to study sprites, jets and elves and terrestrial gamma-ray flashes in connection with thunderstorms. It is hoped that measurements of these phenomena from space will contribute to the understanding of Earth's upper atmosphere.

The ASIM components, originally planned to be completed in 2014, were launched on 2 April 2018 and mounted on the Columbus External Payload Facility on 13 April 2018. Danish tech company Terma A/S is running the technical part of the project for ESA and DTU Space (National Space Institute) from the Technical University of Denmark provides the scientific leadership of the project. Mission operations will be performed by the Belgian User Support and Operations Centre (B.USOC) in Uccle, Belgium.

First results from the measurements revealed that gamma ray bursts form when powerful electric fields course through the atmosphere, just before a lightning bolt travels along the same path. These results were published in July 2019.

== Instruments ==
The ASIM payload has a mass of 314 kg (692 lb) and consists of sub-systems CEPA and DHPU, and two scientific instruments called MXGS and MMIA:

- The Columbus External Payload Adapter (CEPA) and Data Handling and Power Unit (DHPU) form the structural and electrical connections, respectively, to the Columbus module.
- The Modular X and Gamma Ray Instrument (MXGS) is a pair of terrestrial gamma-ray flash (TGF) detectors. The low-energy detector is sensitive from 15 keV to 400 keV, and the high-energy detector is sensitive from 200 keV to 40 MeV.
- The Modular Multi-Imaging Assembly (MMIA) is an optical imaging system capable of observing 12 frames per second continuously in the 777.4 nm and 337 nm bands at 5 nm wide intervals.

== See also ==
- European contribution to the International Space Station
- Scientific research on the International Space Station
- Spacecraft Atmosphere Monitor
