= Sky Polarization Observatory =

Cancelled ISS instrument

- Alternative names: SPOrt
- Wavelength: 22, 32, 90 GHz (1.36, 0.94, 0.33 cm)
- Decommissioned: 2005
- Angular resolution: 7 degree
- Website: sport.iasfbo.inaf.it

The Sky Polarization Observatory (SPOrt) was an Italian instrument planned for launch to the International Space Station in for a planned 2-year mission beginning in 2007. There it would observe 80% of the sky for the Cosmic microwave background radiation in the frequency range from 20 to 100 GHz. Apart from detecting large scale CMB polarization it will also provide maps of Galactic synchrotron emission at lowest frequencies.

The project was headed by Stefano Cortiglioni of the IASF-CNR in Bologna and completely funded by the Italian Space Agency. Due to the project's reliance on the Space Shuttle, and the setback of the Columbia disaster, timely launch was unlikely. Cortiglioni therefore canceled the project in 2005 to allow his team to seek more promising research avenues.

== Instrumentation ==
SPOrt carries four feed horns sensitive at 22, 32 and 90 GHz which feed a bolometer with a pixel sensitivity of 1.7 μK.

== See also ==
- Cosmic microwave background experiments
- Observational cosmology
