= European Technology Exposure Facility =

ESA science observatory platform on the International Space Station

The European Technology Exposure Facility (EuTEF) was a payload mounted on the exterior of the European Columbus laboratory, one of the modules of the International Space Station. The facility, mounted onto the exterior of Columbus, provided a platform for multiple types of experiments and materials to be exposed directly to the harsh space environment.

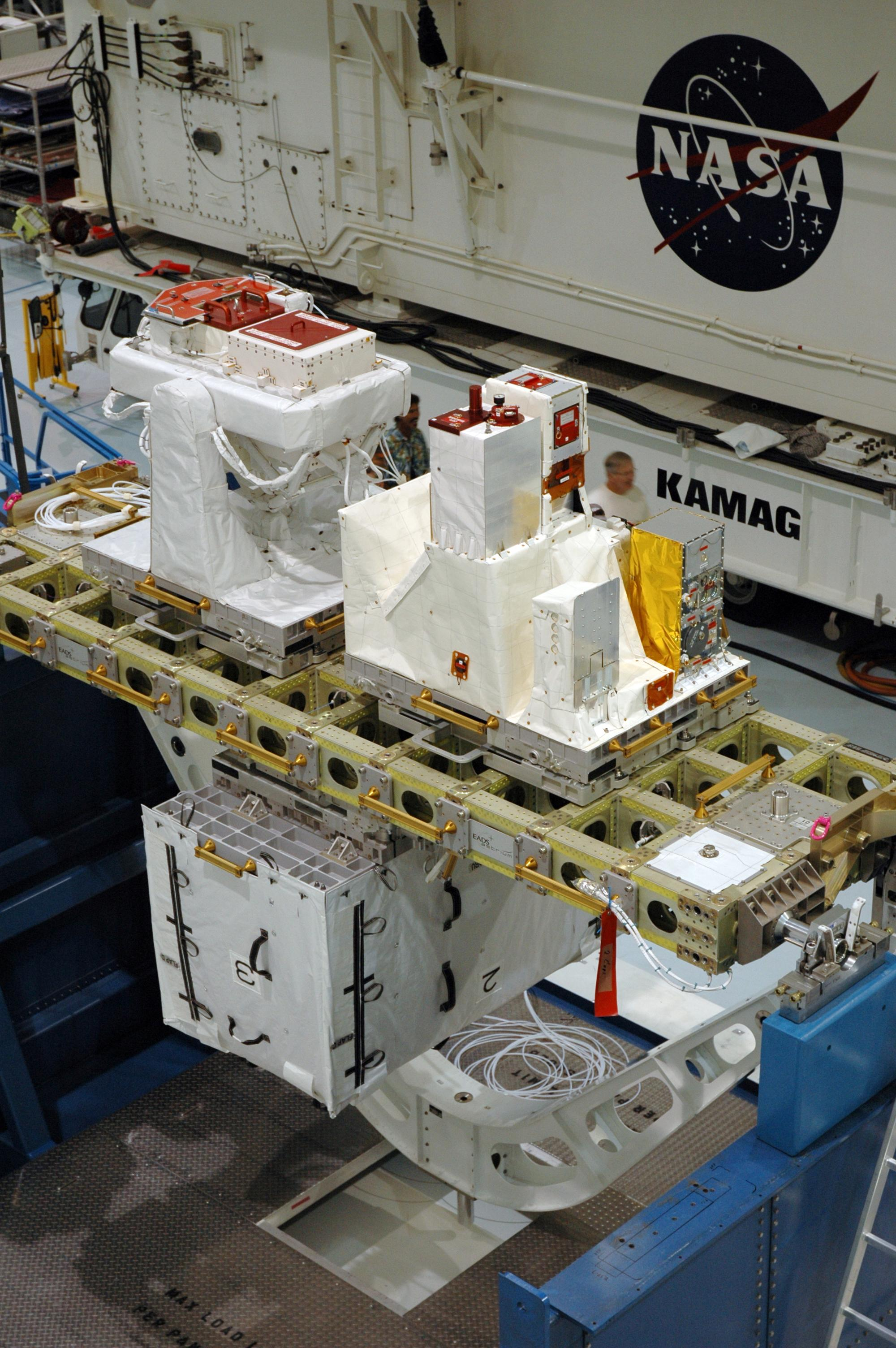
External payloads SOLAR and EuTEF installed on LCC-lite cargo carrier prior to launch on shuttle mission STS-122.

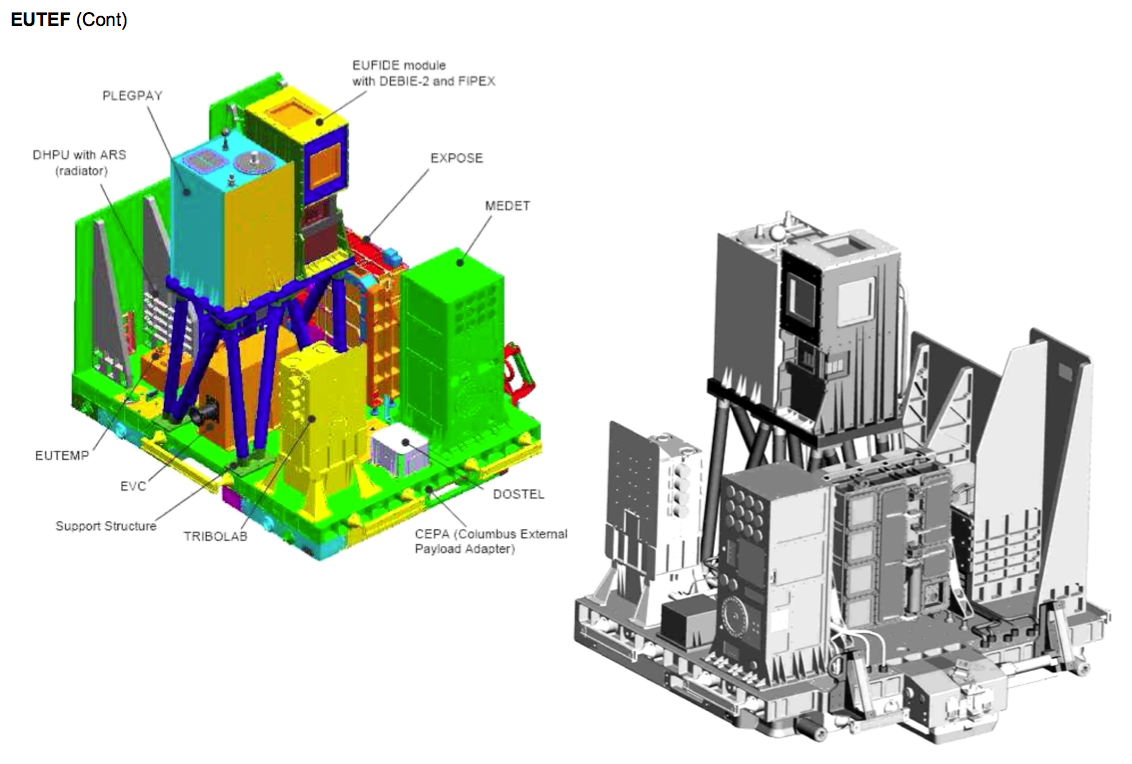
EUTEF art

The EuTEF is a programmable, multifunctional architecture that provides uniform interfaces for instruments. Nine instrument modules are accommodated and operated simultaneously. Each experiment is mounted on the Columbus External Payload Adapter (CEPA), which consists of an adapter plate, the Active Flight Releasable Attachment Mechanism (A-FRAM) and the connectors & harness. The experiments are mounted either directly onto the adapter plate or a support structure that elevates them for optimum exposure to the ram (direction of flight) and zenith directions.

In total, the facility has a mass of 350 kilograms (770 lb). The first set of experiments (successfully mounted during STS-122 and removed during STS-128) mounted to the facility included:

- DEBris In-orbit Evaluator (DEBIE-2): micrometeoroid and orbital debris detector
- EuTEF Thermometer (EuTEMP): measure EuTEF's thermal environment
- Earth Viewing Camera (EVC): Earth observing camera
- Exposure experiment (EXPOSE): An exobiological exposure facility
- Flux(Phi) Probe EXperiment (FIPEX): atomic oxygen detector
- Material Exposure and Degradation Experiment (MEDET): examine material degradation
- Plasma Electron Gun Payload (PLEGPAY): plasma discharge in orbit
- An Experiment on Space Tribology Experiment (Tribolab): testbed for the tribology (study of friction on moving parts) properties of materials

== See also ==
- Scientific research on the ISS
