= NASA Astronaut Group 17 =

1998 human spaceflight selection of 32 candidates; "The Penguins"

The Penguins
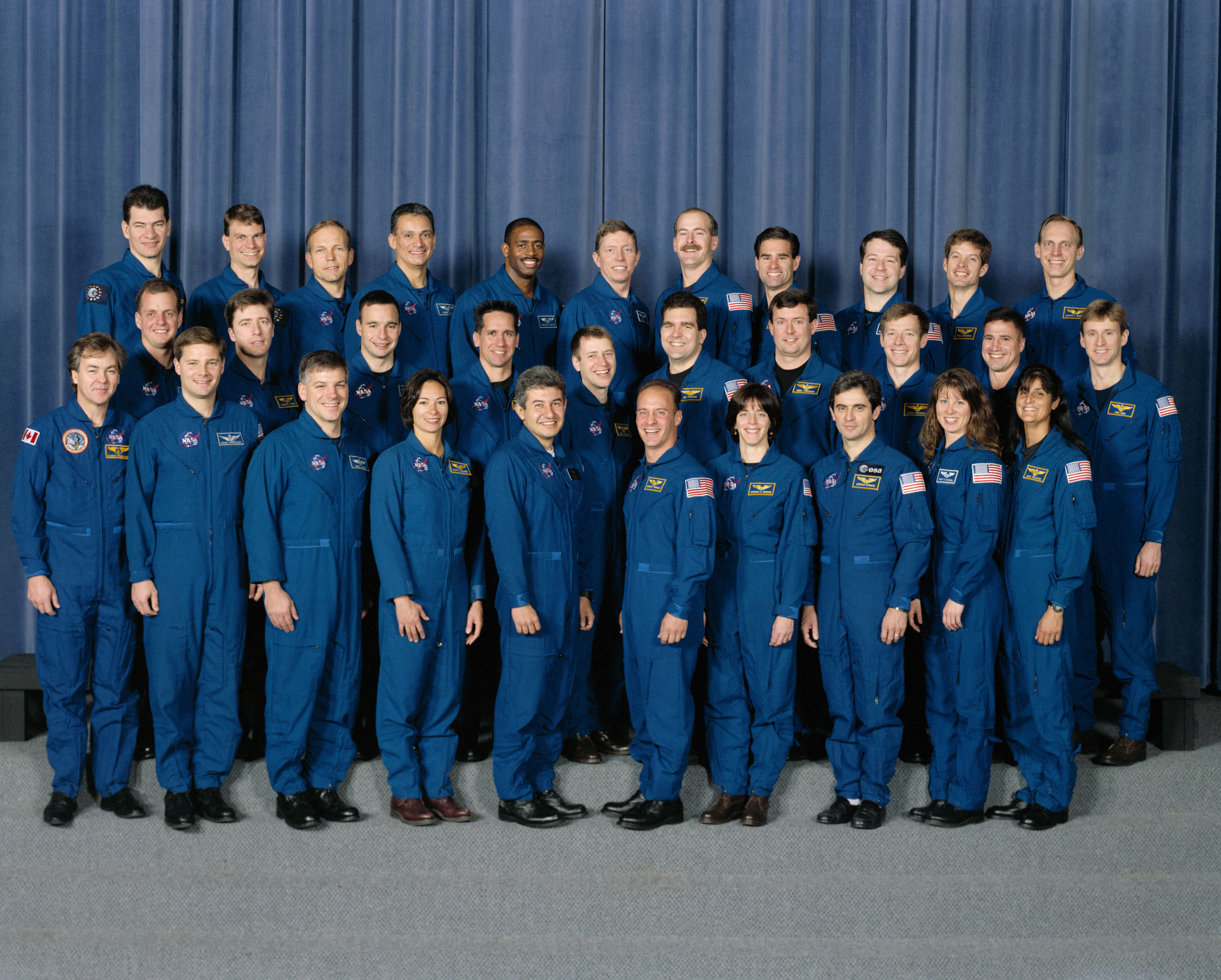
- The astronauts of Group 17
- Year selected: 1998
- Number selected: 32

NASA Astronaut Group 17 (nicknamed "The Penguins") were chosen by NASA in 1998 and announced on June 4 of that year. The group of 32 candidates included eight pilots, 17 mission specialists, and seven international mission specialists who became NASA astronauts. They began training in August 1998.

== Pilots ==
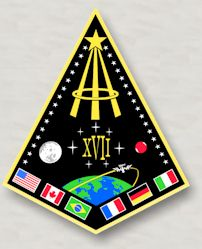
Group Patch

- Lee Archambault (2 flights)
  - Pilot, STS-117 (Atlantis)
  - Commander, STS-119 (Discovery)
- Christopher Ferguson (3 flights)
  - Pilot, STS-115 (Atlantis)
  - Commander, STS-126 (Endeavour)
  - Commander, STS-135 (Atlantis)
- Kenneth Ham (2 flights)
  - Pilot, STS-124 (Discovery)
  - Commander, STS-132 (Atlantis)
- Gregory C. Johnson (1 flight)
  - Pilot, STS-125
- Gregory H. Johnson (2 flights)
  - Pilot, STS-123, (Endeavour)
  - Pilot, STS-134, (Endeavour)
- William Oefelein (dismissed from the NASA astronaut corps and reassigned to the U.S. Navy, later retiring from military service) (1 flight)
  - Pilot, STS-116, (Discovery)
- Alan Poindexter (2 flights)
  - Pilot, STS-122, (Atlantis)
  - Commander, STS-131 (Discovery)
- George Zamka (2 flights)
  - Pilot, STS-120, (Discovery)
  - Commander, STS-130, (Endeavour)

== Mission specialists ==
- Clayton Anderson (2 flights)
  - STS-117 (Atlantis); launched to the ISS
  - Flight engineer, Expedition 15
  - STS-120 (Discovery; landed from ISS)
  - STS-131 (Discovery)
- Tracy Caldwell (3 flights)
  - STS-118 (Endeavour)
  - Soyuz TMA-18
  - Flight engineer, Expedition 23/Expedition 24
  - Soyuz MS-25
  - Flight engineer, Expedition 70/Expedition 71
- Gregory Chamitoff (2 flights)
  - NEEMO 3
  - Mission Specialist, STS-124 (Discovery; launched to ISS)
  - Flight engineer, Expedition 17/Expedition 18 (also served as a science officer)
  - Mission Specialist, STS-126 (Endeavour; landed from ISS)
  - Mission Specialist, STS-134 (Endeavour)
- Timothy Creamer (1 flight)
  - Soyuz TMA-17 (Expedition 22/23)
- Michael Foreman (2 flights)
  - Mission specialist, STS-123 (Endeavour)
  - Mission specialist, STS-129 (Atlantis)
- Michael Fossum (3 flights)
  - Mission specialist, STS-121 (Discovery)
  - Mission specialist, STS-124 (Discovery)
  - Soyuz TMA-02M
  - Flight engineer, Expedition 28
  - Commander, Expedition 29
- Stanley G. Love (1 flight)
  - Mission specialist, STS-122 (Atlantis)
- Leland Melvin (2 flights)
  - Mission specialist, STS-122 (Atlantis)
  - Mission specialist, STS-129 (Atlantis)
- Barbara Morgan (1 flight) (Note: Originally selected as a backup for the Teacher in Space Project, which was terminated after the Space Shuttle Challenger disaster.)
  - Mission specialist, STS-118 (Endeavour)
- John Olivas (2 flights)
  - Mission specialist, STS-117 (Atlantis)
  - Mission specialist, STS-128 (Discovery)
- Nicholas Patrick (2 flights)
  - Mission specialist, STS-116 (Discovery)
  - Mission specialist, STS-130 (Endeavour)
- Garrett Reisman (2 flights)
  - STS-123 (Endeavour; launched to ISS)
  - Flight engineer, Expedition 16/Expedition 17
  - STS-124 (Discovery; landed from ISS)
  - STS-132 (Atlantis)
- Patricia Robertson
- Steven Swanson (3 flights)
  - Mission specialist, STS-117 (Atlantis)
  - Mission specialist, STS-119 (Discovery)
  - Soyuz TMA-12M
  - Flight engineer, Expedition 39
  - Commander, Expedition 40
- Douglas H. Wheelock (2 flights)
  - Mission specialist, STS-120 (Discovery)
  - Soyuz TMA-19
  - Flight engineer, Expedition 24
  - Commander, Expedition 25
- Sunita Williams (3 flights)
  - STS-116 (Discovery; launched to ISS)
  - Flight engineer, Expedition 14/Expedition 15
  - STS-117 (Atlantis; landed from ISS)
  - Soyuz TMA-05M
  - Flight engineer, Expedition 32
  - Commander, Expedition 33
  - Pilot, Boeing CFT (Calypso) (Launched on Calypso for Expedition 71/72)
  - Mission specialist, SpaceX Crew-9 (Crew Dragon Freedom) (Landed on Freedom for Expedition 71/72)
    - Flight engineer, Expedition 71
    - Commander, Expedition 72
- Neil Woodward

== International mission specialists ==
- Léopold Eyharts, France (2 flights)
  - Soyuz TM-27 (to Mir; launched only)
  - Soyuz TM-26 (from Mir; landed only)
  - STS-122 (Atlantis – to International Space Station (ISS); launched only)
  - Flight Engineer, Expedition 16
  - STS-123 (Endeavour – from ISS; landed only)
- Paolo Nespoli, Italy (3 flights)
  - STS-120 (Discovery – ISS mission)
  - Soyuz TMA-20 (Expedition 26/27)
  - Soyuz MS-05 (Expedition 52/53)
- Marcos Pontes, Brazil (1 flight) (first Brazilian in space)
  - Spaceflight Participant, Soyuz TMA-8 (launched only)
  - Spaceflight Participant, Soyuz TMA-7 (landed only)
  - Spaceflight Participant, Expedition 13, International Space Station (9 days only)
- Hans Schlegel, Germany (2 flights)
  - Payload Specialist, STS-55 (Columbia – Spacelab)
  - Mission Specialist, STS-122 (Atlantis – to ISS)
- Robert Thirsk, Canada (2 flights)
  - Payload Specialist, STS-78 (Columbia; Spacelab)
  - Soyuz TMA-15 (Expedition 20/21)
- Bjarni Tryggvason, Canada (1 flight)
  - Payload Specialist, STS-85 (Discovery)
- Roberto Vittori (Italy) (3 flights)
  - Soyuz TM-34 (launched only), Soyuz TM-33 (landed only)
  - Soyuz TMA-6 (launched only), Soyuz TMA-5 (landed only)
  - Mission Specialist, STS-134 (Endeavour)

== See also ==
- List of astronauts by selection
