= Hans Schlegel =

German physicist and astronaut (born 1951)

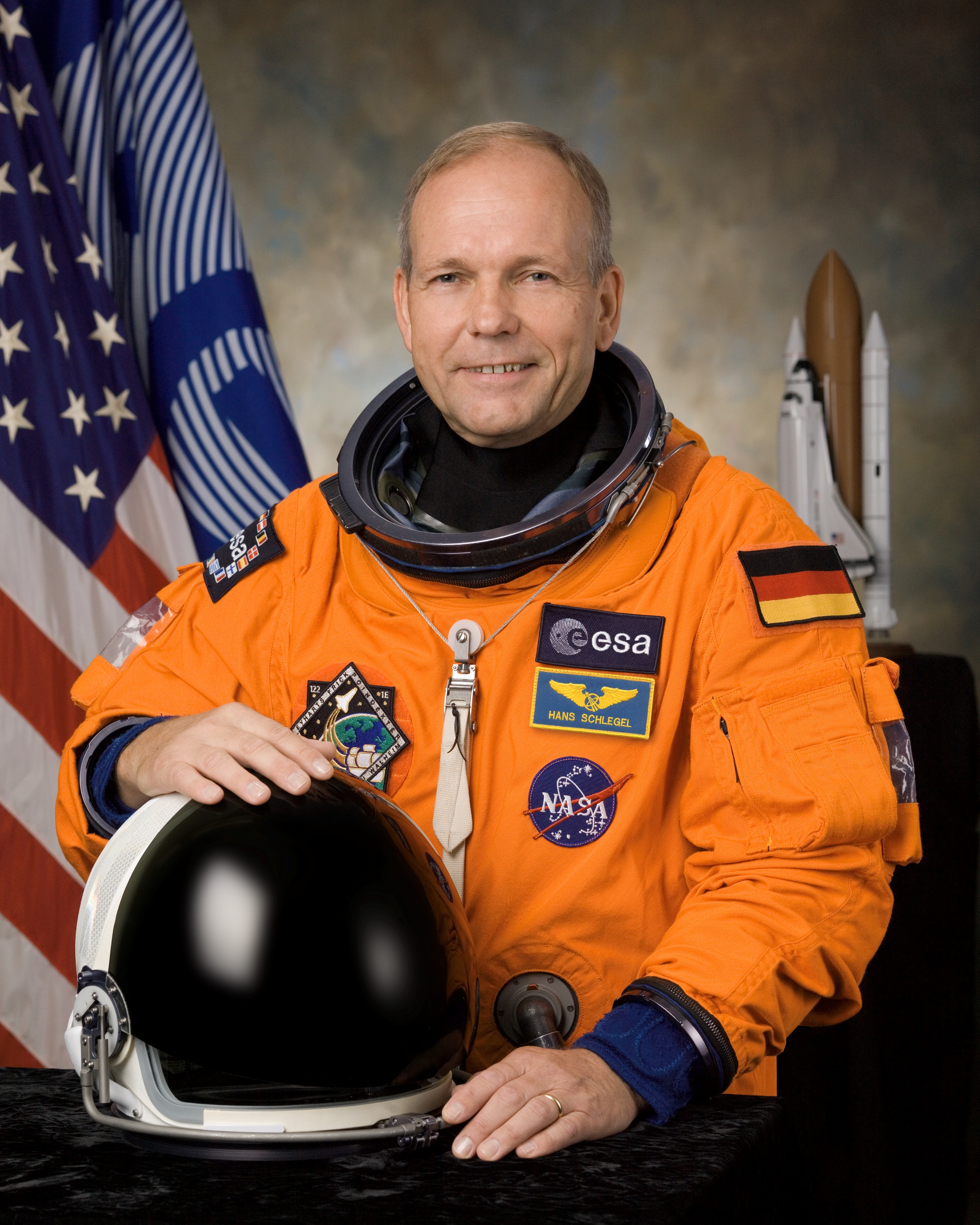
- Born: 3 August 1951 (age 75); Überlingen, West Germany
- Occupation: Physicist
- Spouse: Heike Walpot
- Children: 7
- Space career

DLR/ESA astronaut (retired)
- Time in space: 22d 18h 02m
- Selection: 1987 German Group, NASA Group 17 (1998), 1998 ESA Group
- Missions: STS-55, STS-122

Hans Wilhelm Schlegel (Überlingen, 3 August 1951) is a German physicist, a former ESA astronaut, and a veteran of two NASA Space Shuttle missions.

== Early life and education ==
Schlegel, born and raised in Germany, graduated as an international exchange student from Lewis Central High School in Council Bluffs, Iowa and Hansa Gymnasium in Cologne before studying physics at RWTH Aachen University in his home country. After having received his university degree, he conducted research in semiconductor physics before being trained as an astronaut in the late 1980s by the German Aerospace Center (DLR). He flew as a DLR payload specialist in 1993 aboard Space Shuttle mission STS-55, which included the German-sponsored Spacelab D-2 research module.

== ESA career ==
From 1995 to 1997, he trained as the backup crew member for the German-Russian Mir'97 mission, and afterwards received additional training in Russia to become qualified as a second board engineer for the Mir space station. In 1998, he became a member of the European Astronaut Corps.

Schlegel was a mission specialist on the STS-122 Space Shuttle mission. The mission was charged with carrying the Columbus laboratory into orbit and connecting it to the International Space Station.

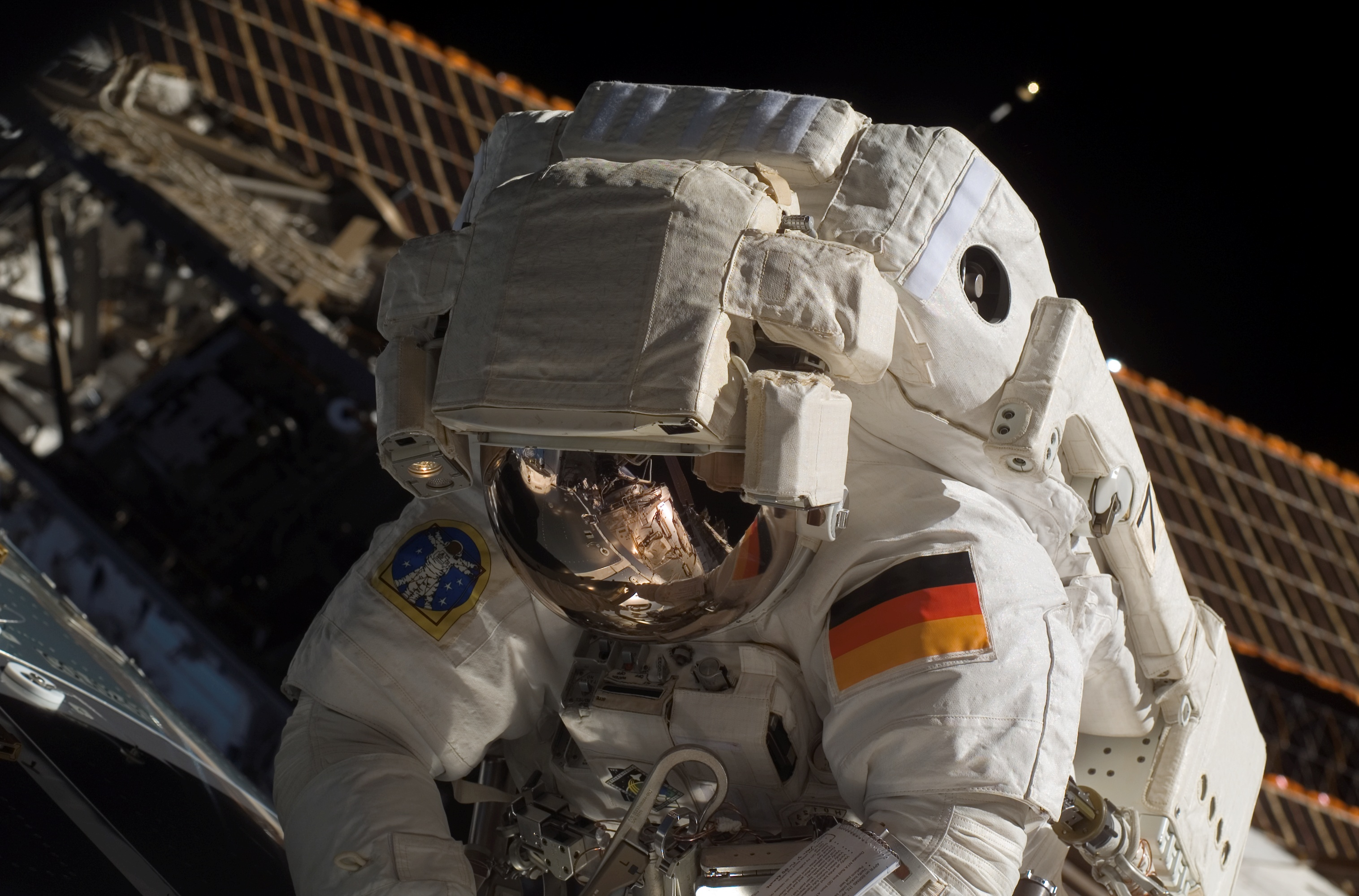
Schlegel in Space

Hans was to perform a spacewalk on the first EVA (EVA1) of STS-122, on Sunday, 10 February 2008, in preparation for attaching the Columbus laboratory to the ISS. The EVA was postponed until Monday 11 February 2008 due to an undisclosed medical issue allegedly affecting Schlegel. Stanley G. Love performed the spacewalk instead of Schlegel. However, Schlegel did perform the second EVA on Wednesday 13 February 2008. During the spacewalk, he completed the replacement of the Nitrogen Tank Assembly on the P1 truss of the International Space Station, and installed trunnion covers on the Columbus module.
