= Stan Love =

Stan Love may refer to:

- Stan Love (basketball) (1949–2025), American basketball player
- Stanley G. Love (born 1965), American astronaut
