= Bob Dempsey =

NASA flight director

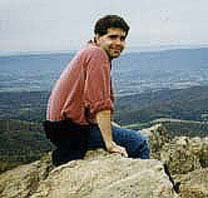
Bob Dempsey

Robert "Dr. Bob" Dempsey is a NASA flight director for the International Space Station, selected in 2005. As astronomer he worked at the Space Telescope Science Institute (STScI) prior to joining the ISS project. For five years he worked in the Onboard Data Interfaces and Networks (ODIN) group and then as a Communication and Tracking Officer before being selected as a flight director in 2005. He was the lead flight director for Expedition 15, worked several ISS assembly missions including STS-122 (1E), STS-123 (1J/A), and STS-124 (1J), and was the lead for STS-130 (20A) and for ATV-2 (Johannes Kepler). He works with Boeing on the Commercial Crew Program's CST-100 (Starliner) vehicle.

He was an undergraduate at University of Michigan, and received his Ph.D. in physics and astronomy from the University of Toledo. He grew up in Michigan, is married to his wife Dorothea, and he enjoys cooking and traveling. Dempsey is a member of the International Astronomical Union

== Expedition 15 ==
Dempsey oversaw the jettisoning of the 1,400-pound (640 kg), refrigerator-sized Early Ammonia Servicer (EAS), along with an unused stanchion which had previously held a camera, from the International Space Station during Expedition 15. What is left of the refrigerator after re-entry impacted Earth in the summer of 2008. Dempsey stated that the decision to jettison the equipment in this required some planning, saying "It's not a decision that's made lightly. Besides the fact that it might have some use in the future, it provides space debris that could later impact the space station," and further adding that this was necessary largely due to space and timing constraints on available Space Shuttle payloads.

== Bibliography ==
- Goddard High-Resolution Spectrograph Observations of Procyon and HR 1099
- The ROSAT All-Sky Survey of active binary coronae. I - Quiescent fluxes for the RS Canum Venaticorum systems
- Multiwavelength Observations of Two Moderate Rotation RS CVn Systems: V815 Herculis and IM Pegasi
- The active chromosphere binary HD 17433 (VY Arietis)
- Chromospheric CA II H and K and H-alpha emission in single and binary stars of spectral types F6-M2
- Observations of the CA II infrared triplet in chromospherically active single and binary stars
- Line profile asymmetries in chromospherically active stars
- H-alpha spectroscopy of active-chromosphere stars. I - Six G-K giants
- Goddard High Resolution Spectrograph Observations of Variability in the RS Canum Venaticorum System V711 Tauri (HR 1099)
- Extremely active long-period RS CVn binary HD 12545
- The ROSAT All-Sky Survey of active binary coronae. II - Coronal temperatures of the RS Canum Venaticorum systems
- Thank You for Flying the Vomit Comet
- The International Space Station: Operating an Outpost in the New Frontier
