= Neil Woodward =

Former NASA astronaut (born 1962)

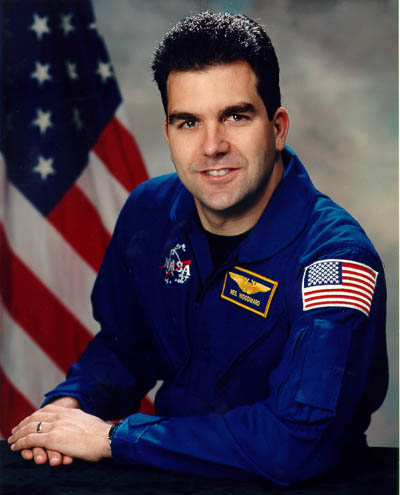
- Born: July 26, 1962 (age 64); Chicago, Illinois, U.S.
- Education: Massachusetts Institute of Technology (BS); University of Texas, Austin (MS); George Washington University (MS)
- Space career

NASA astronaut
- Rank: Commander, USN
- Selection: NASA Group 17 (1998)

Neil W. Woodward III (born July 26, 1962, in Chicago, Illinois) is an American naval officer and a former NASA astronaut.

== Personal life ==
He is married. His hobbies include reading, computers, sailing, music, wine, and cooking. His father, Dr. Neil W. Woodward Jr., resides in Oklahoma City, Oklahoma. His mother, Aileen S. Woodward, is deceased. He is a member of the United States Naval Institute and the Tau Epsilon Phi fraternity.

== Education ==
Woodward attended Putnam City High School in Oklahoma City, graduating in 1980. He then attended the Massachusetts Institute of Technology, earning a degree in physics in 1984. While at MIT, he was a brother of the Tau Epsilon Phi fraternity. He attended graduate school at the University of Texas at Austin, working in the Center for Relativity and then the Fusion Research Center. His thesis research involved using optical spectroscopy to investigate neoclassical plasma rotation in the Texas Experimental Tokamak fusion reactor. He received his master's degree in physics in 1988. Later, in 2000, he earned his master's degree in engineering management from George Washington University.

== Military career ==
Woodward joined the US Navy, reporting to Aviation Officer Candidate School in Pensacola, Florida. He was commissioned in January 1989 and earned his wings as a naval flight officer in March 1990. He reported to NAS Whidbey Island, Washington, where he completed initial bombardier/navigator training in the A-6E Intruder and was then assigned to the Green Lizards of Attack Squadron 95. Woodward made two deployments with VA-95 aboard the aircraft carrier USS Abraham Lincoln in support of Operation Desert Storm (postcease-fire), Southern Watch, and Somalia. He was then assigned to the Naval Strike Warfare Center in Fallon, Nevada, where he served as weaponeering officer and contingency cell officer. In 1995, he was selected to attend the U.S. Naval Test Pilot School at NAS Patuxent River, Maryland, and graduated with distinction in July 1996. Upon graduation, he was assigned to the Air Vehicle/Stores Compatibility Department at the Naval Strike Aircraft Test Squadron in Patuxent River. While there, he cross-trained in the F/A-18 Hornet and tested stores and systems for the F/A-18B, F/A-18D, and F/A-18F aircraft. Woodward was assigned to the Strike Aircraft Test Squadron when he was selected for the astronaut program.

Woodward logged over 1,700 flight hours in more than 25 different aircraft and has 265 arrested landings.

== NASA career ==
Selected by NASA in June 1998, Woodward reported for training in August 1998. Astronaut candidate training included orientation briefings and tours, numerous scientific and technical briefings, intensive instruction in Shuttle and International Space Station systems, physiological training, and ground school to prepare for T-38 flight training, as well as learning water and wilderness survival techniques.

From July 2004 to July 2008, Woodward was on detached duty to Exploration Systems Mission Directorate at NASA headquarters in various roles, including director of the ESMD Integration Office and director, Commercial Orbital Transportation Services.

Woodward retired from the Navy and NASA in October 2008, and currently works in the field of information technology for Amazon.

== Awards and honors ==
- Distinguished graduate, US Naval Test Pilot School
- Empire Test Pilot School Award for Best Developmental Test Thesis, USNTPS
- Navy Commendation Medals (2)
- Navy Achievement Medals (2)
- Texas Business Hall of Fame fellowship (2000)
