= Alan G. Poindexter =

American test pilot and astronaut (1961–2012)

Alan Poindexter
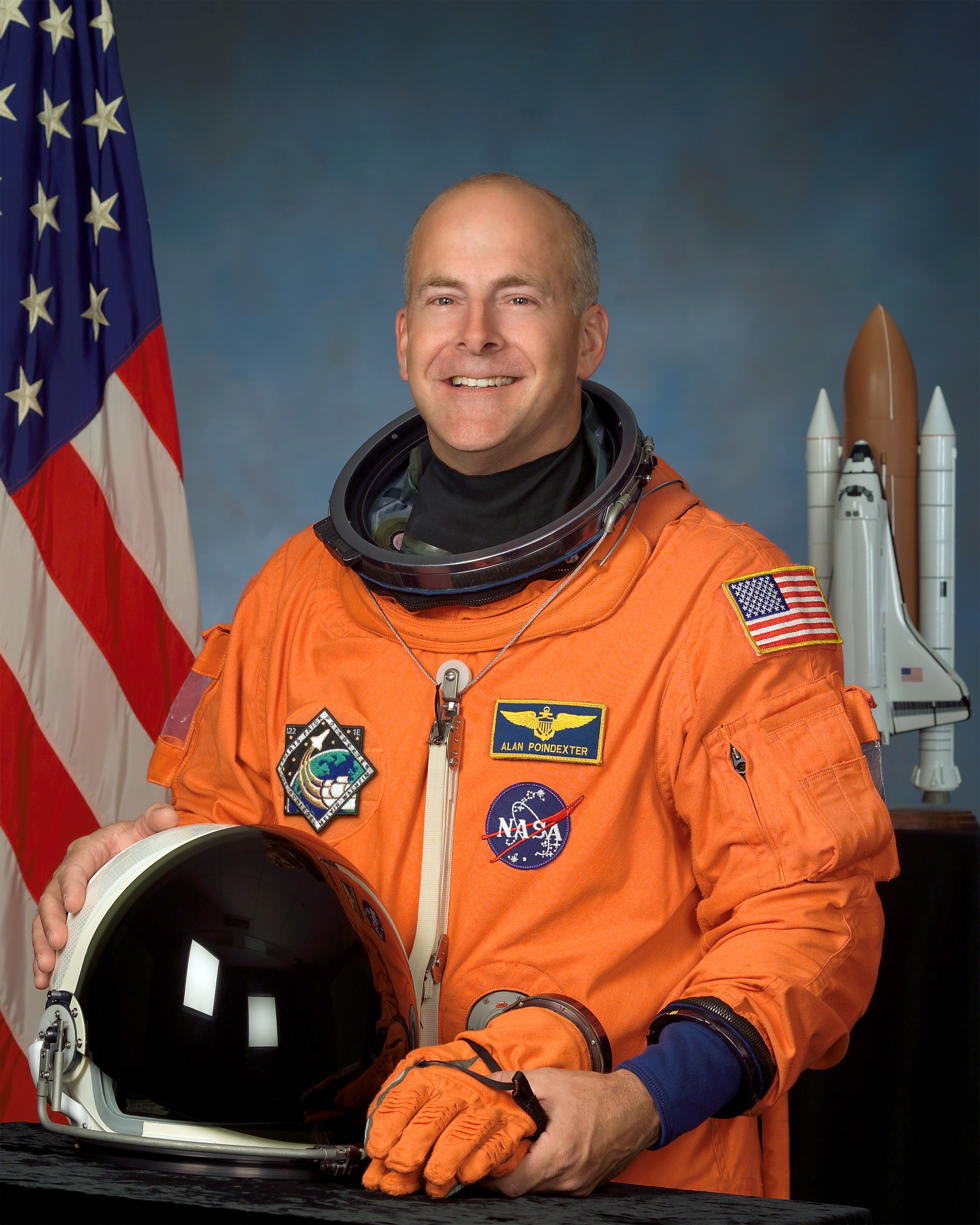
- Born: Alan Goodwin Poindexter; November 5, 1961; Pasadena, California, U.S.
- Died: July 1, 2012 (aged 50); Pensacola Beach, Florida, U.S.
- Other name: Dex
- Education: Pensacola State College (AS); Georgia Institute of Technology (BS); Naval Postgraduate School (MS)
- Space career

NASA astronaut
- Rank: Captain, USN
- Time in space: 27d 21h 9m
- Selection: NASA Group 17 (1998)
- Mission: STS-122; STS-131

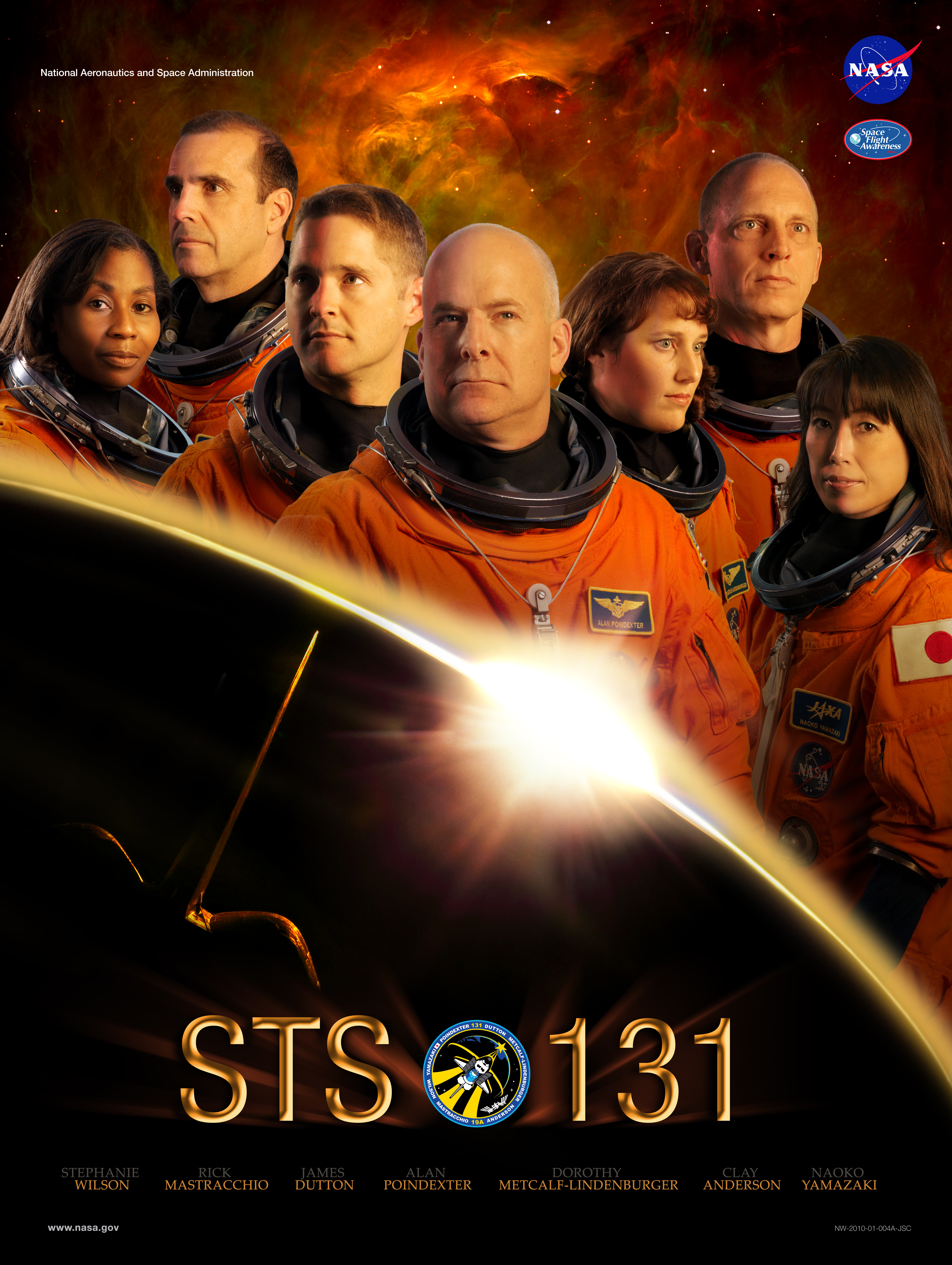
Crew poster for STS-131

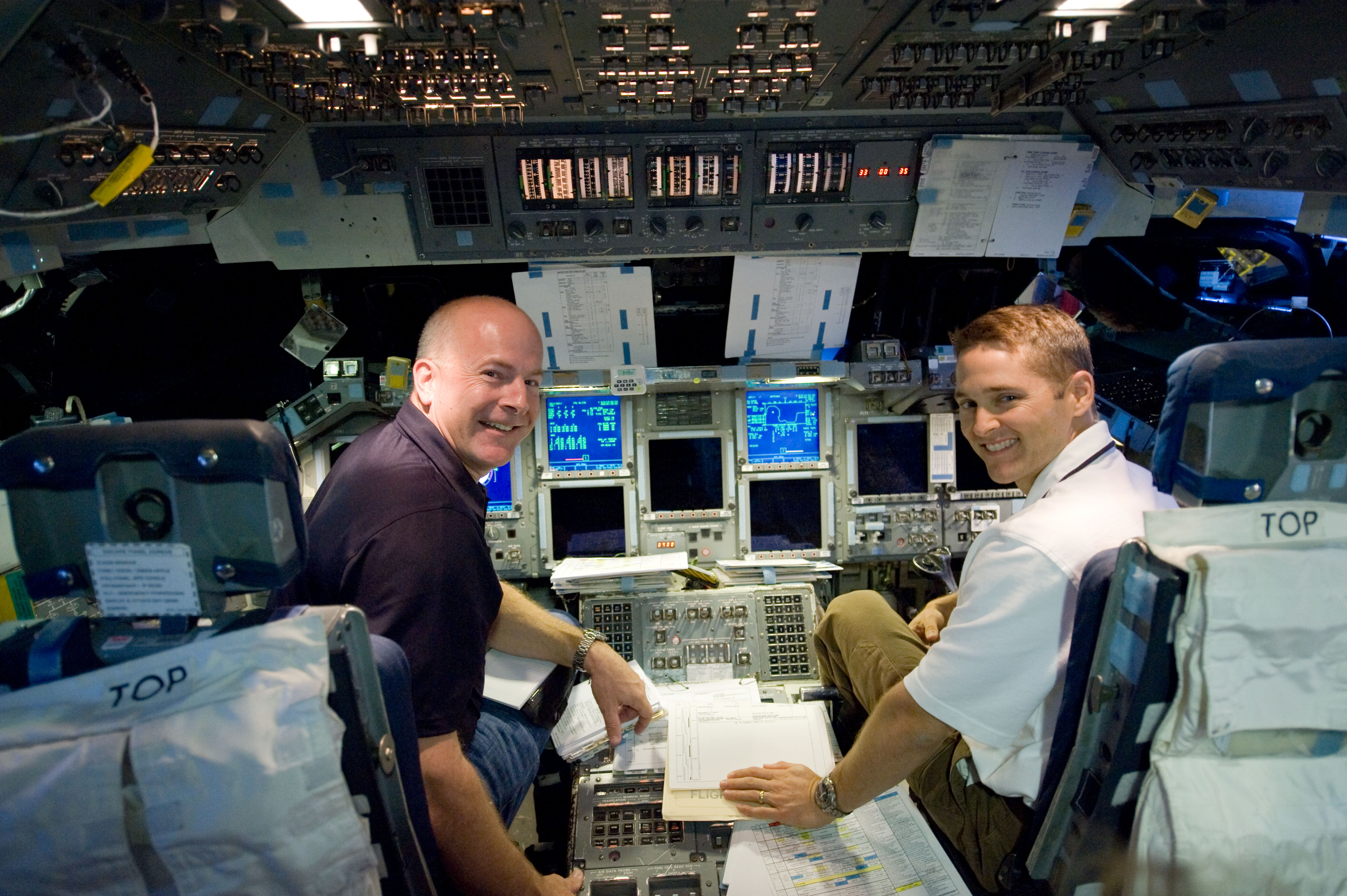
Poindexter (left) in the Shuttle Mission Simulator, 2009

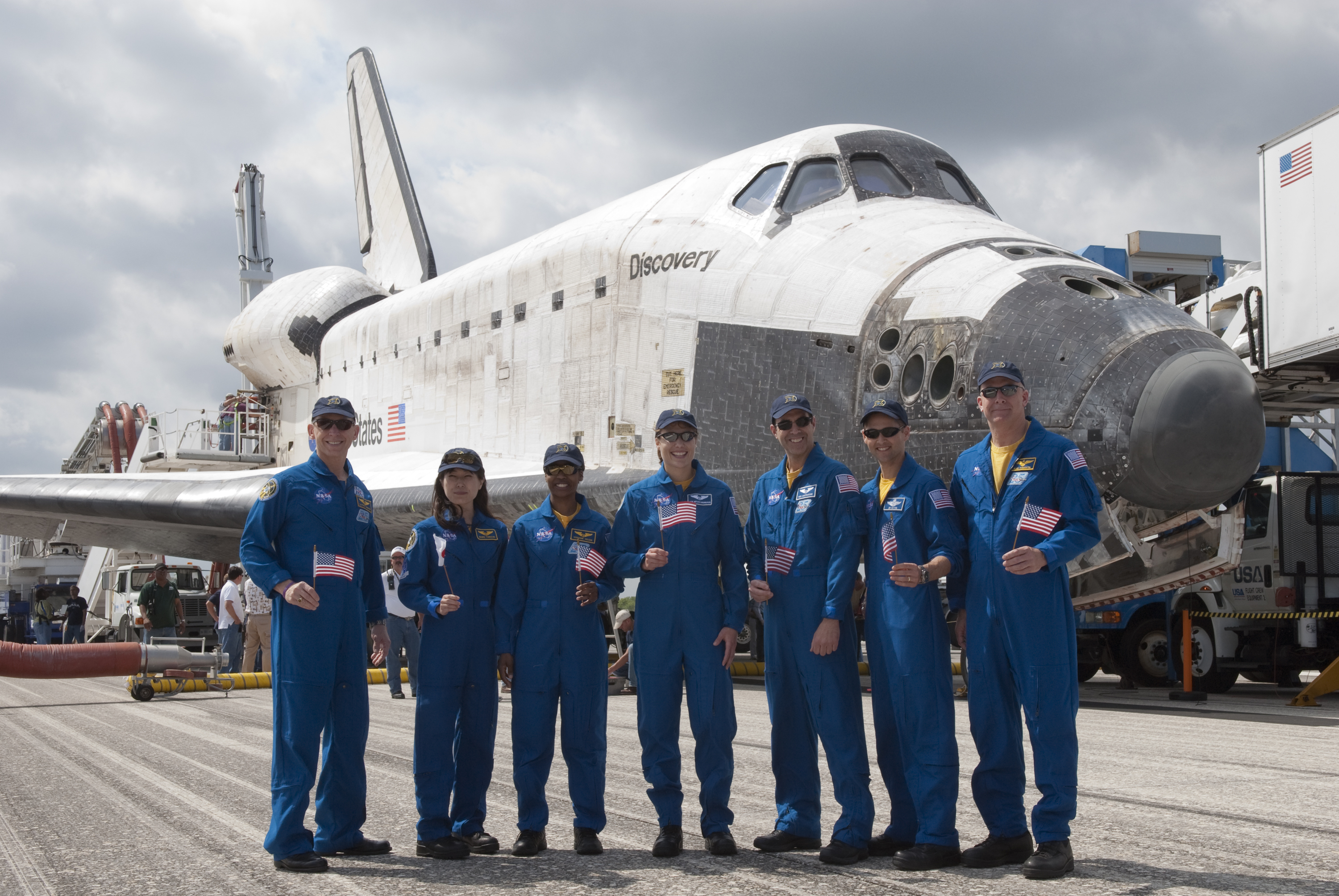
The crew of STS-131 pose in front of the Shuttle orbiter after the mission. Commander Poindexter first from the right side.

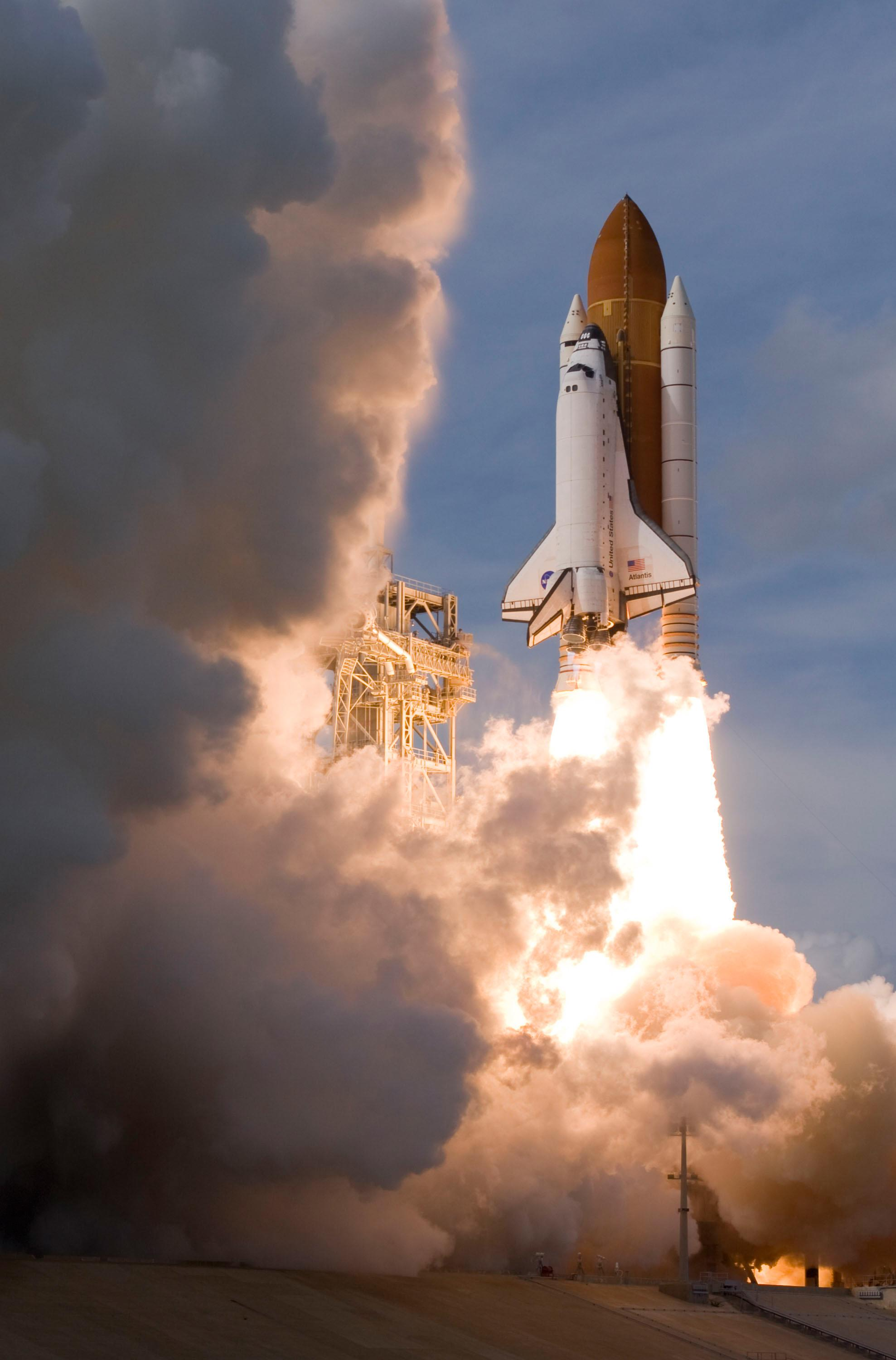
STS-122 begins its mission to deliver the Columbus laboratory to the International Space Station.

Alan Goodwin Poindexter (November 5, 1961 – July 1, 2012) was an American naval officer and a NASA astronaut. Poindexter was selected in the 1998 NASA Group (G17) and went into orbit aboard Space Shuttle missions STS-122 and STS-131.

== Personal life ==
Poindexter was born to John Poindexter and Linda Poindexter in Pasadena, California, and grew up in Rockville, Maryland, which he considered to be his hometown. He was married to Lisa A. Pfeiffer of Gulf Breeze, Florida. They had two children. His recreational interests included motorcycling, running, weight lifting, water skiing, boating, hunting and fishing.

== Education ==
Poindexter attended high school at Coronado High School in Coronado, California, graduating in 1979. He received an associate degree in engineering from Pensacola Junior College in Pensacola, Florida, in 1983, before transferring to Georgia Institute of Technology. He graduated in 1986 with highest honors with a bachelor's degree of aerospace engineering. In 1995, he received a Master of Science degree in aeronautical engineering from the U.S. Naval Postgraduate School.

== Military career ==
Poindexter was commissioned in the United States Navy following graduation from the Georgia Institute of Technology in 1986. After a short period of service at the Hypervelocity Wind Tunnel Facility, Naval Surface Weapons Center, White Oak, Maryland, Poindexter reported for flight training in Pensacola, Florida. He was designated a Naval Aviator in 1988 and reported to Fighter Squadron 124 (VF-124), Naval Air Station Miramar, California, for transition to the F-14 Tomcat. Following his initial training, Poindexter was assigned to Fighter Squadron 211 (VF-211), also at Miramar, and made two deployments to the Persian Gulf, including Operation Southern Watch. During his second deployment in 1993, he was selected to attend the Naval Postgraduate School/U.S. Naval Test Pilot School Cooperative Program. Following graduation in December 1995, Poindexter was assigned as a test pilot and Project Officer at VX-23, the Naval Strike Aircraft Test Squadron (NSATS) at Naval Air Station Patuxent River, Maryland. While at Naval Strike Aircraft Test Squadron, Poindexter was assigned as the lead test pilot for the F-14 Digital Flight Control System where he logged the first carrier landing and catapult launch of an F-14 with the upgraded flight controls. He also flew numerous high angle of attack/departure tests, weapons separation tests and carrier suitability trials. Following his tour at Patuxent River, Poindexter reported to Fighter Squadron 32 (VF-32) at Naval Air Station Oceana, Virginia, where he was serving as a department head when he was selected for astronaut training.

Poindexter had more than 4,000 hours in over 30 aircraft types and logged over 450 carrier landings.

Following his retirement from the NASA Astronaut Corps in 2010, Poindexter returned to serve in the U.S. Navy as dean of students and executive director of programs at the Naval Postgraduate School.

== NASA career ==
Selected by NASA in June 1998, he reported for training in August 1998. Initially, Poindexter served in the Astronaut Office Shuttle Operations Branch performing duties as the lead support astronaut at Kennedy Space Center. In December 2002, he was named as pilot on STS-120 mission to deliver the Harmony connecting node to the International Space Station; an assignment which abruptly ended with the Space Shuttle Columbia disaster just two months later. In July 2006, Poindexter was assigned as pilot on the STS-122 mission that delivered the European Space Agency's Columbus Laboratory to the International Space Station in February 2008.

Poindexter served as a lead CAPCOM for the STS-125 mission to service the Hubble Space Telescope in May 2009, as well as the launch CAPCOM for the STS-127 mission in July 2009. He was the commander of STS-131, which launched in April 2010. The mission's primary payload was the Multi-Purpose Logistics Module.

On his retirement from NASA service in December 2010, Peggy Whitson, Chief of the Astronaut Office at NASA's Johnson Space Center in Houston said that: "Dex was a well-respected leader within our office, We will miss him being part of our team and wish him the best in his new role as he continues his service to the Navy and the country."

=== Spaceflights ===
STS-122 aboard Atlantis (February 7–20, 2008) was the 24th Space Shuttle mission to visit the International Space Station. Mission highlight was the delivery and installation of the European Space Agency's Columbus Laboratory. It took three spacewalks by crewmembers to prepare the Columbus Laboratory for its scientific work, and to replace an expended nitrogen tank on the Station's P-1 Truss. STS-122 was also a crew replacement mission, delivering Expedition 16 flight engineer, ESA astronaut Léopold Eyharts, and returning home with Expedition 16 flight engineer, NASA astronaut Daniel M. Tani. The STS-122 mission was accomplished in 12 days, 18 hours, 21 minutes and 40 seconds, and traveled 5,296,832 statute miles in 203 Earth orbits.

STS-131 aboard Discovery (April 5–20, 2010), a resupply mission to the International Space Station (ISS), launched just before dawn from the Kennedy Space Center. Upon arrival at the station, Discovery's crew performed three spacewalks to replace an empty ammonia tank for the ISS Thermal Control System. They also transferred more than 13,000 pounds of hardware, supplies and equipment. Included in the transfer, were a new crew sleeping quarters, and three scientific experiment racks. On the return journey, the MPLM (Leonardo Multi-Purpose Logistics Module) inside Discovery's payload bay was packed with more than 6,000 pounds of hardware, and scientific and technical research return samples. The STS-131 mission lasted 15 days, 02 hours, 47 minutes, 10 seconds, and traveled 6,232,235 statute miles in 238 Earth orbits.

== Navy ==
After NASA he returned to the U.S. Navy. In the Navy, he had the position of dean of students at the Naval Postgraduate School.

== Death ==
On July 1, 2012, Poindexter died due to injuries he received from a water scooter accident in Little Sabine Bay in Pensacola Beach, Florida. Poindexter had stopped his jet ski while riding with his son and was hit by another jet ski driven by his other son. After being thrown in the water, he lost consciousness while being taken to shore. CPR was attempted, and he was airlifted to Baptist Hospital, where he was pronounced dead. NASA released a statement after he died, stating "The NASA family was sad to learn of the passing of our former friend, and colleague Alan Poindexter who was killed today during a jet ski accident in Florida. Our thoughts and hearts are with his family."

== Organizations ==
- Society of Experimental Test Pilots
- Association of Space Explorers

== Awards and honors ==
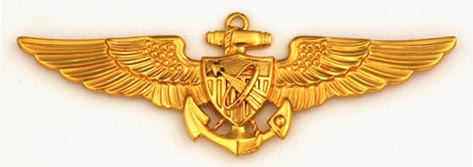

1st Row	Naval Aviator Badge with United States Astronaut Device		
2nd Row	Legion of Merit		Defense Meritorious Service Medal
3rd Row	Distinguished Flying Cross	Navy and Marine Corps Commendation Medal with Combat Valor device	Navy and Marine Corps Achievement Medal
4th Row	Navy Meritorious Unit Commendation	Battle “E”	NASA Space Flight Medal
5th Row	National Defense Service Medal	Southwest Asia Service Medal	Sea Service Deployment Ribbon
6th Row	Kuwait Liberation Medal (Kuwait)	Marksmanship Medal for Rifle Expert	Marksmanship Medal for Pistol Expert

- Naval Air Warfare Center, Aircraft Division Test Pilot of the Year 1996
- Top Ten Carrier Aviator, Carrier Air Wing Nine
- NASA Aviation Safety Award
- Orbital ATK's July 2016 CRS1-5 mission Cygnus CRS OA-5's Cygnus space capsule was named S.S. Alan Poindexter in his honor.
