= STS-122 =

2008 American crewed spaceflight to the ISS

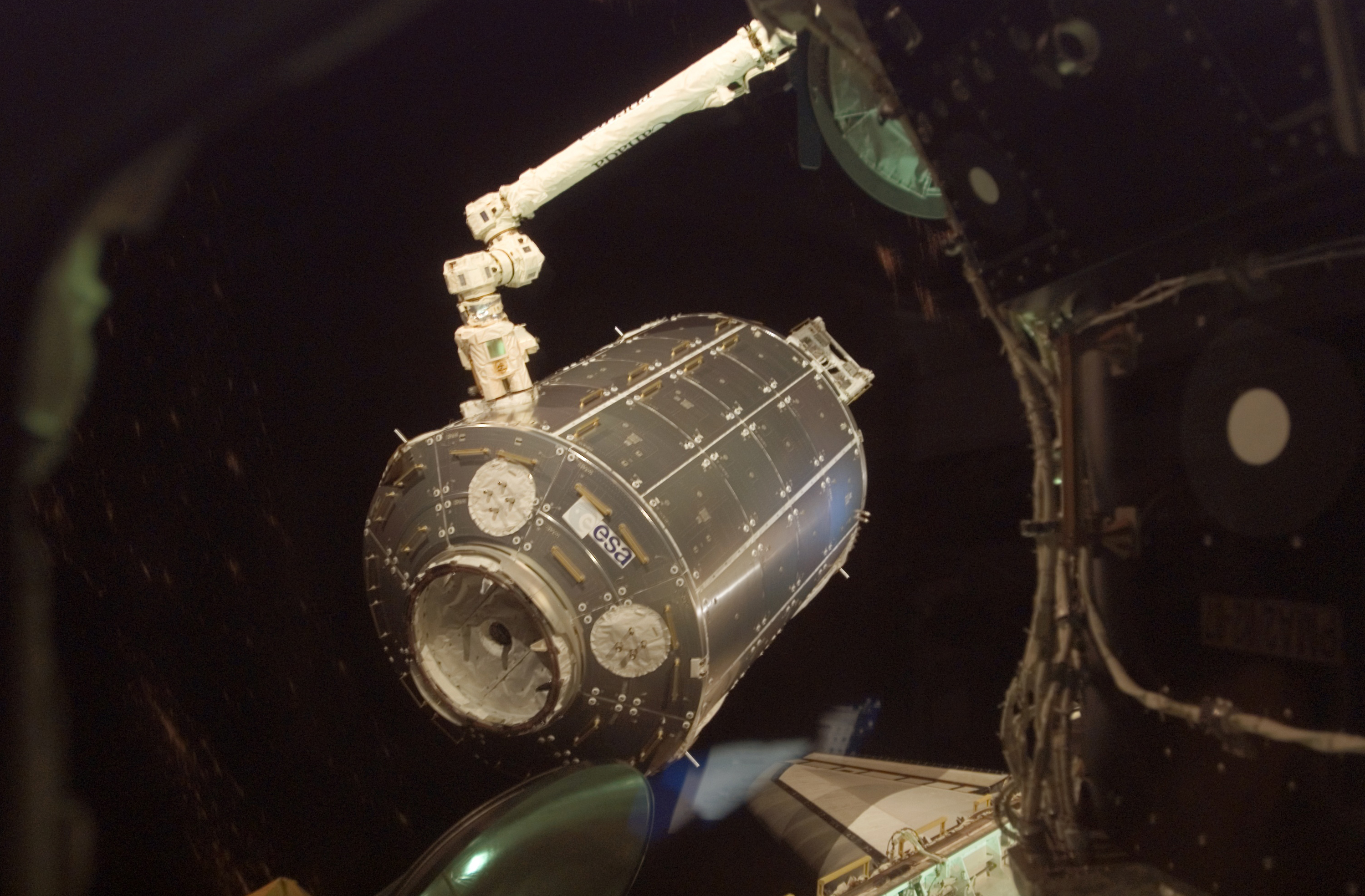
- Canadarm2 takes Columbus from Atlantis' payload bay, ahead of its installation on the ISS
- Names: Space Transportation System-122
- Mission type: ISS assembly
- Operator: NASA
- COSPAR ID: 2008-005A
- SATCAT no.: 32486
- Mission duration: 12 days, 18 hours, 21 minutes, 50 seconds
- Distance travelled: 8,500,000 kilometres (5,300,000 mi)
- Orbits completed: 202

Spacecraft properties
- Spacecraft: Space Shuttle Atlantis
- Launch mass: 121,264 kilograms (267,341 lb)
- Landing mass: 93,536 kilograms (206,212 lb)

Crew
- Crew size: 7
- Members: Stephen Frick; Alan G. Poindexter; Leland D. Melvin; Rex J. Walheim; Hans Schlegel; Stanley G. Love
- Launching: Léopold Eyharts
- Landing: Daniel M. Tani

Start of mission
- Launch date: February 7, 2008, 19:45 UTC 2:45:30 pm EDT
- Launch site: Kennedy, LC-39A

End of mission
- Landing date: February 20, 2008, 14:07:10 UTC 9:07:10 am EDT
- Landing site: Kennedy, SLF Runway 15

Orbital parameters
- Reference system: Geocentric
- Regime: Low Earth
- Perigee altitude: 331 kilometres (206 mi)
- Apogee altitude: 339 kilometres (211 mi)
- Inclination: 51.6 degrees
- Period: 91.23 minutes
- Epoch: February 9, 2008

Docking with ISS
- Docking port: PMA-2 (Harmony forward)
- Docking date: February 9, 2008, 17:17 UTC
- Undocking date: February 18, 2008, 09:24 UTC
- Time docked: 8 days, 16 hours, 7 minutes
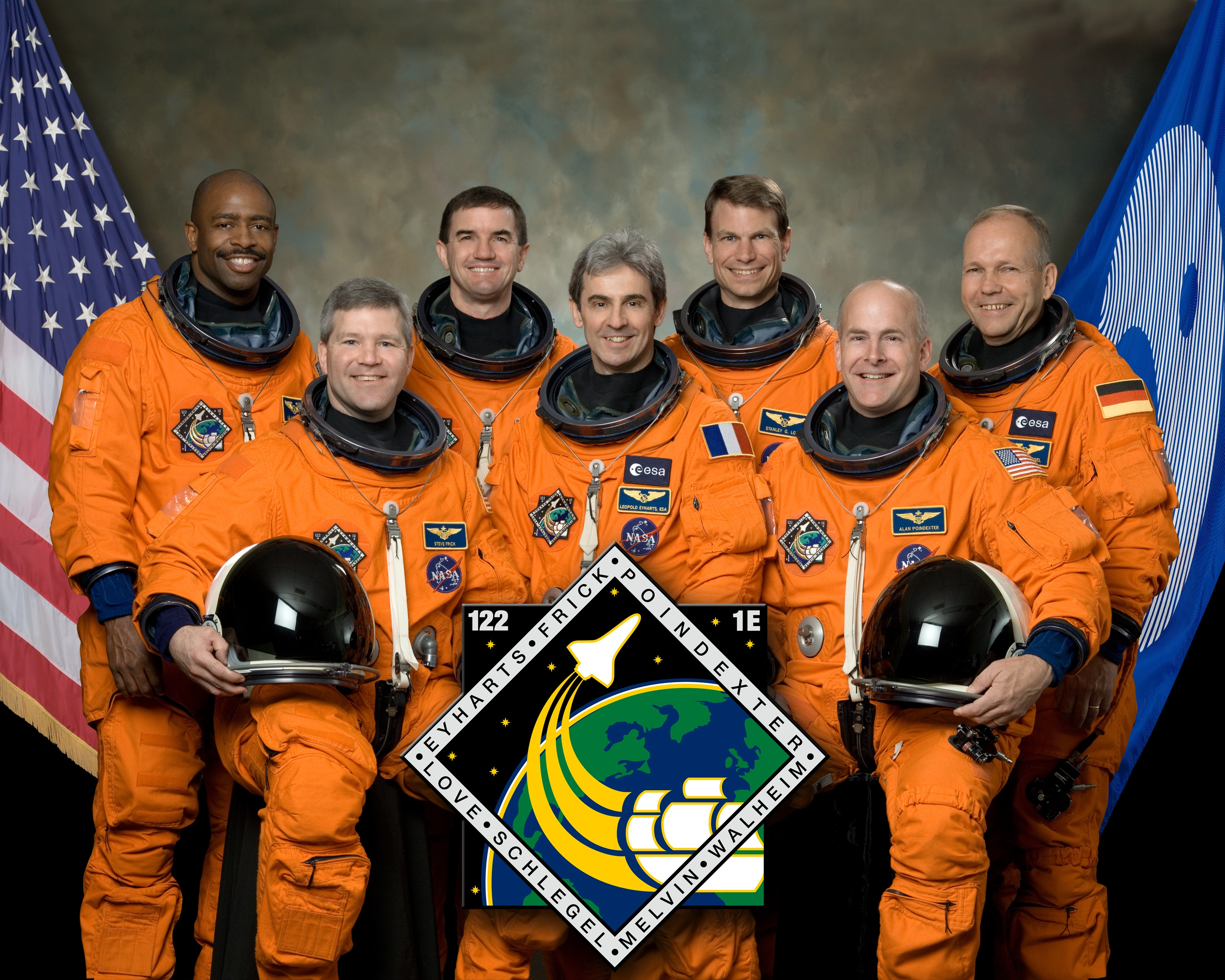
- Left to right - Front row: Frick, Eyharts, Poindexter; Back row: Melvin, Walheim, Love, Schlegel Space Shuttle program

STS-122 was a NASA Space Shuttle mission to the International Space Station (ISS), flown by the Space Shuttle Atlantis. STS-122 marked the 24th shuttle mission to the ISS, and the 121st Space Shuttle flight overall.

The mission was also referred to as ISS-1E by the ISS program. The primary objective of STS-122 was to deliver the European Columbus science laboratory, built by the European Space Agency (ESA), to the station. It also returned Expedition 16 Flight Engineer Daniel M. Tani to Earth. Tani was replaced on Expedition 16 by Léopold Eyharts, a French Flight Engineer representing ESA. After Atlantis landing, the orbiter was prepared for STS-125, the final servicing mission for the Hubble Space Telescope.

The original target launch date for STS-122 was December 6, 2007, but due to engine cutoff sensor (ECO) reading errors, the launch was postponed to December 9, 2007. During the second launch attempt, the sensors failed again, and the launch was halted. A tanking test on December 18, 2007, revealed the probable cause to lie with a connector between the external tank and the shuttle. The connector was replaced and the shuttle launched during the third attempt on February 7, 2008.

== Crew ==
Position	Launching Astronaut	Landing Astronaut
Commander	(United States) Stephen Frick; Second and last spaceflight	
Pilot	(United States) Alan G. Poindexter; First spaceflight	
Mission Specialist 1	(United States) Leland D. Melvin; First spaceflight	
Mission Specialist 2 Flight Engineer	(United States) Rex J. Walheim; Second spaceflight	
Mission Specialist 3	(Germany) Hans Schlegel, ESA; Second and last spaceflight	
Mission Specialist 4	(United States) Stanley G. Love; Only spaceflight	
Mission Specialist 5	(France) Léopold Eyharts, ESA; Expedition 16; Second and last spaceflight ISS Flight Engineer	(United States) Daniel M. Tani; Expedition 16; Second and last spaceflight ISS Flight Engineer

=== Crew seat assignments ===
Seat	Launch	Landing	Seats 1–4 are on the flight deck. Seats 5–7 are on the mid-deck.
1	Frick		Seats 1–4 are on the flight deck. Seats 5–7 are on the mid-deck.
2	Poindexter		Seats 1–4 are on the flight deck. Seats 5–7 are on the mid-deck.
3	Melvin		Seats 1–4 are on the flight deck. Seats 5–7 are on the mid-deck.
4	Walheim		Seats 1–4 are on the flight deck. Seats 5–7 are on the mid-deck.
5	Schlegel		Seats 1–4 are on the flight deck. Seats 5–7 are on the mid-deck.
6	Love		Seats 1–4 are on the flight deck. Seats 5–7 are on the mid-deck.
7	Eyharts	Tani	Seats 1–4 are on the flight deck. Seats 5–7 are on the mid-deck.

== Mission payloads ==
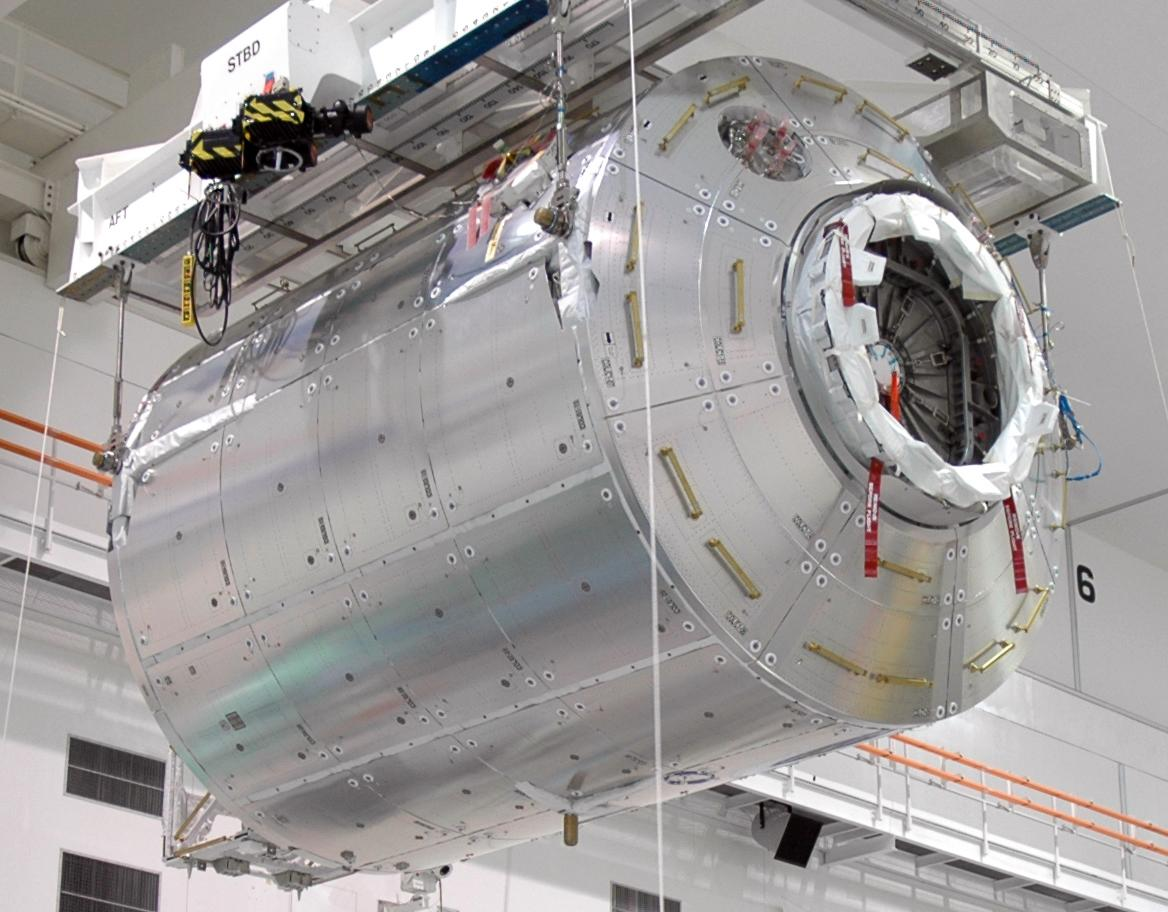
Columbus in the SSPF at Kennedy Space Center

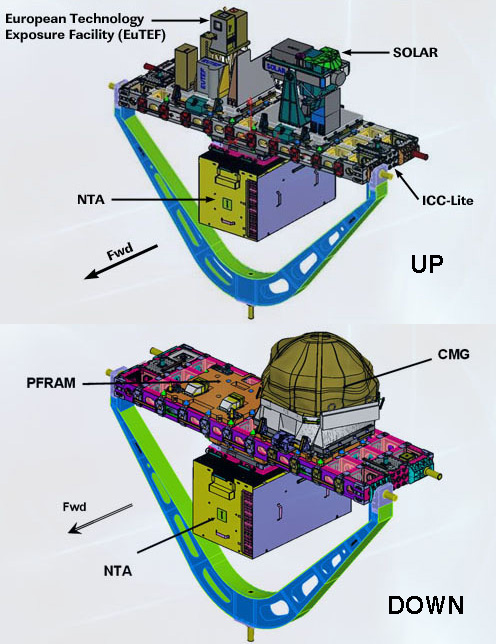
ICC-Lite STS-122

STS-122 was the ISS Assembly Flight 1E, which delivered the European Columbus laboratory module to the station, along with the Biolab, Fluid Science Laboratory (FSL), European Drawer Rack (EDR), and European Physiology Modules (EPM) payloads.

STS-122 also carried the Solar Monitoring Observatory (SOLAR), the European Technology Exposure Facility (EuTEF), and a new Nitrogen Tank Assembly, mounted in the cargo bay of an ICC-Lite payload rack, as well as a spare Drive Lock Assembly (DLA) sent to orbit in support of possible repairs to the starboard Solar Alpha Rotary Joint (SARJ), which was malfunctioning.

Several items were returned with Atlantis: A malfunctioning Control Moment Gyroscope (CMG) that was swapped out with a new one during STS-118, and the empty Nitrogen Tank Assembly was placed in the orbiter's payload bay, along with a trundle bearing from the Starboard SARJ that was removed during an EVA performed by Expedition 16.

Location	Cargo	Mass
Bay 1–2	Orbiter Docking System; EMU 3015 / EMU 3017	1,800 kilograms (4,000 lb); ~240 kilograms (530 lb)
Bay 3P	Shuttle Power; Distribution Unit (SPDU)	~100 kilograms (220 lb)
Bay 5P	Power/Data Grapple; Fixture (PDGF) for Columbus	71 kilograms (157 lb)
Bay 6	ICC-LITE with EUTEF, SOLAR, NTA	2,063 kilograms (4,548 lb)
Bay 7P	ECSH (EVA Cargo Stowage) on APC	~100 kilograms (220 lb)
Bay 8–12	Columbus Orbital Facility	12,077 kilograms (26,625 lb)
Starboard Sill	Orbiter Boom Sensor System	~450 kilograms (990 lb)
Port Sill	Canadarm	~410 kilograms (900 lb)
	Total:	17,311 kilograms (38,164 lb)

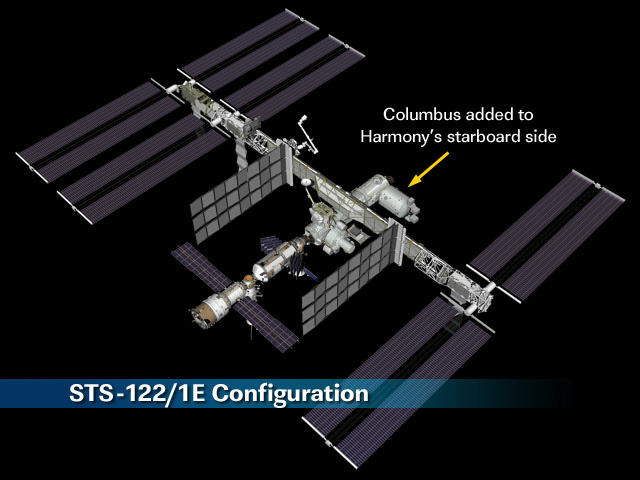
Illustration of the ISS after STS-122, highlighting the addition of the Columbus laboratory module.

=== Outreach ===
Stowed within the Official Flight Kit (OFK), Atlantis carried three green starting flags provided by NASCAR in recognition of the 50th running of the Daytona 500 on February 17, 2008, and the 50th anniversary of NASA on October 1, 2008. Once returned to Earth, one of the flown flags will be placed on public display at the Daytona International Speedway in Florida, one will be presented to Ryan Newman, the winner of the 2008 Daytona 500, and the third will be used by NASA as part of its anniversary activities.

== Mission background ==
The mission marks:

- 152nd NASA crewed spaceflight.
- 121st Space Shuttle flight since STS-1.
- 29th flight of Atlantis
- 96th post-Challenger mission.
- 8th post-Columbia mission.
- 8th visit to the International Space Station for Atlantis.
- 300th US astronaut in space.

== Shuttle processing ==
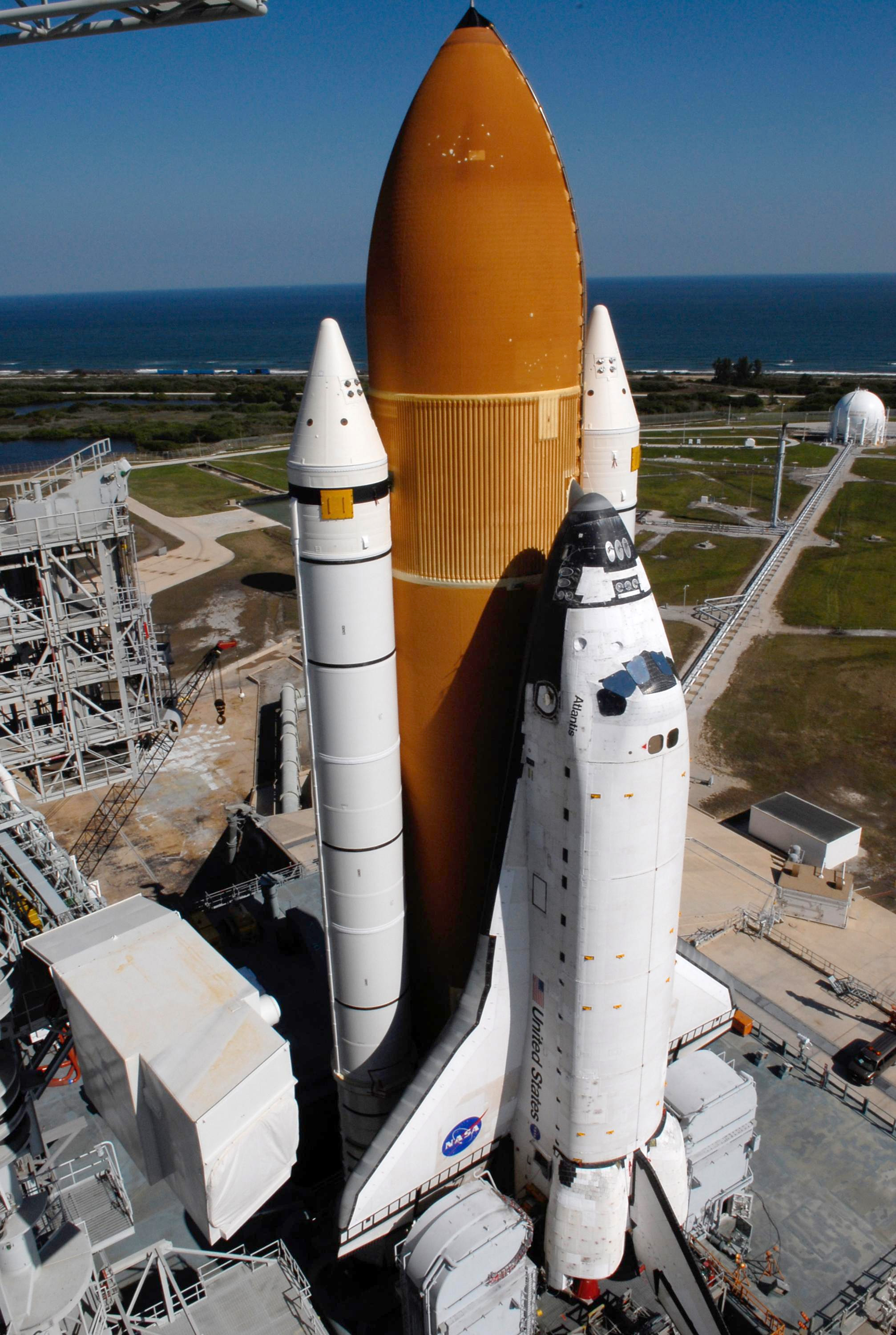
Atlantis arrived at Launch pad 39A on November 10.

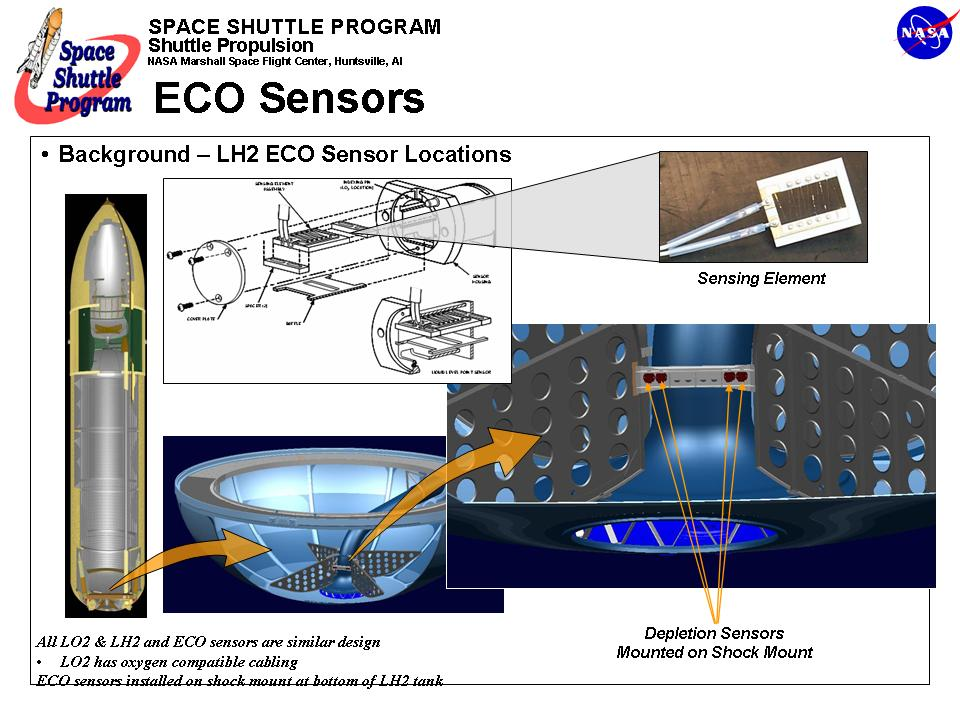
The external tank LH2 cut-off sensors shown here have repeatedly delayed the STS-122 launch.

=== Launch preparations ===
The external tank (ET-125) arrived at the Kennedy Space Center on September 14, 2007, after traveling by barge from the Michoud Assembly Facility in Louisiana. The external tank was then transferred to the Vehicle Assembly Building (VAB) to be inspected, and have the liquid oxygen feedline bracket modified, before being mated to the solid rocket boosters on October 17, 2007.

The external tank was attached to the solid rocket boosters on October 18, 2007, and Atlantis moved to the VAB on November 3, 2007. With the entire stack placed upon the mobile launcher platform, Atlantis moved to launch pad 39A on November 10, 2007, and the Columbus module was loaded into the orbiter's payload bay on November 12. The terminal countdown demonstration test was completed on November 20, 2007.

Following the final Flight Readiness Review on November 30, 2007, NASA managers announced that Atlantis was ready to fly, and the launch date of December 6, 2007, was confirmed. The crew arrived at Kennedy Space Center on December 3, 2007, to prepare for the first launch attempt on December 6, 2007.

=== December 6 (launch attempt 1) ===
On Thursday, December 6, 2007, 16 minutes into the loading of the liquid hydrogen and liquid oxygen into the external tank, two of the four liquid hydrogen engine cutoff (ECO) sensors failed to respond correctly, resulting in Launch Director Doug Lyons deciding to postpone the launch. The fuel cutoff sensor system is one of a series of redundant systems that protect the shuttle's main engines, by triggering engine shutdown if fuel runs unexpectedly low. The Launch Commit Criteria (LCC) require that three of the four sensor systems function properly prior to liftoff. The scheduled launch time was tentatively postponed 48 hours to December 8, 2007, at 15:43 EST (20:43 UTC).

On December 7, 2007, managers evaluated the options to fly, under the flight rationale guidelines. The issue was thought to be in the wiring inside the external tank, that results in the ECO sensors reporting incorrectly. During loading, testing of the ECO sensors is done to ensure they function properly, but when the "dry tank" command was sent, the third and fourth sensors continued to report "wet" conditions. The concern was that if the tank were about to run dry, the sensors that control the shutdown of the shuttle's main engines might not send the shutdown command, resulting in running the engines without fuel, a dangerous situation. Managers evaluated if the Launch Commit Criteria could be removed, allowing Atlantis to fly with two of four sensors, and augment the LCO system with on-ground monitoring of propellant use by the Flight Control staff. The other option would involve repair or replacement of the sensors, which would most likely require the orbiter be moved back into the Vehicle Assembly Building, and would rule out a December launch.

Following the Mission Management Team meeting on December 7, 2007, Shuttle Program Director Wayne Hale explained during the press briefing that the team had discussed the issues at length, and had tentatively decided to attempt a Sunday launch. The Launch Commit Criteria would be changed, and Flight Controller procedures would be finalized to allow for additional monitoring of the ECO system during ascent. One of the changes to the LCC will be the requirement that during tanking, all four sensors must be operational. In the past, when this system has failed during the initial launch attempt, all four sensors performed normally during the next attempt. If this were the case for Sunday's launch attempt, it would be consistent with what has been seen in the past. If the sensors fail during re-tanking on December 9, 2007, this would indicate that the issue is not consistent with the evidence seen in the past. Managers would hold an MMT meeting on December 8, 2007, to further discuss this rationale, and the Flight Controller procedures, before making a final decision.

On December 8, 2007, the Mission Management Team met to finalize plans for the Sunday launch, and discuss possible launch options. There was a unanimous decision to attempt a Sunday launch using the modified Launch Commit Criteria. The modified criteria require all four ECO sensors to function normally during tanking, include the implementation of a Flight Controller procedure to continue monitoring the ECO sensors after liftoff during ascent, and shorten the launch window from five minutes to one minute to conserve fuel. Those changes would be done only for the launch of STS-122, and are not permanent changes. Should any of the sensors give errors during tanking, the launch attempt would be scrubbed. Following STS-122, Space Shuttle Program Director Wayne Hale and Mission Management Team Chairman LeRoy Cain explained that there would be a variety of activities and procedures put into effect to address the ECO issues. A multi-center troubleshooting team would be convened, and changes to the main engines would be performed, to improve the way the engines use and control the liquid hydrogen reserves, including upgrades to the flow meters inside the engines.

=== December 9 (Launch attempt 2) ===
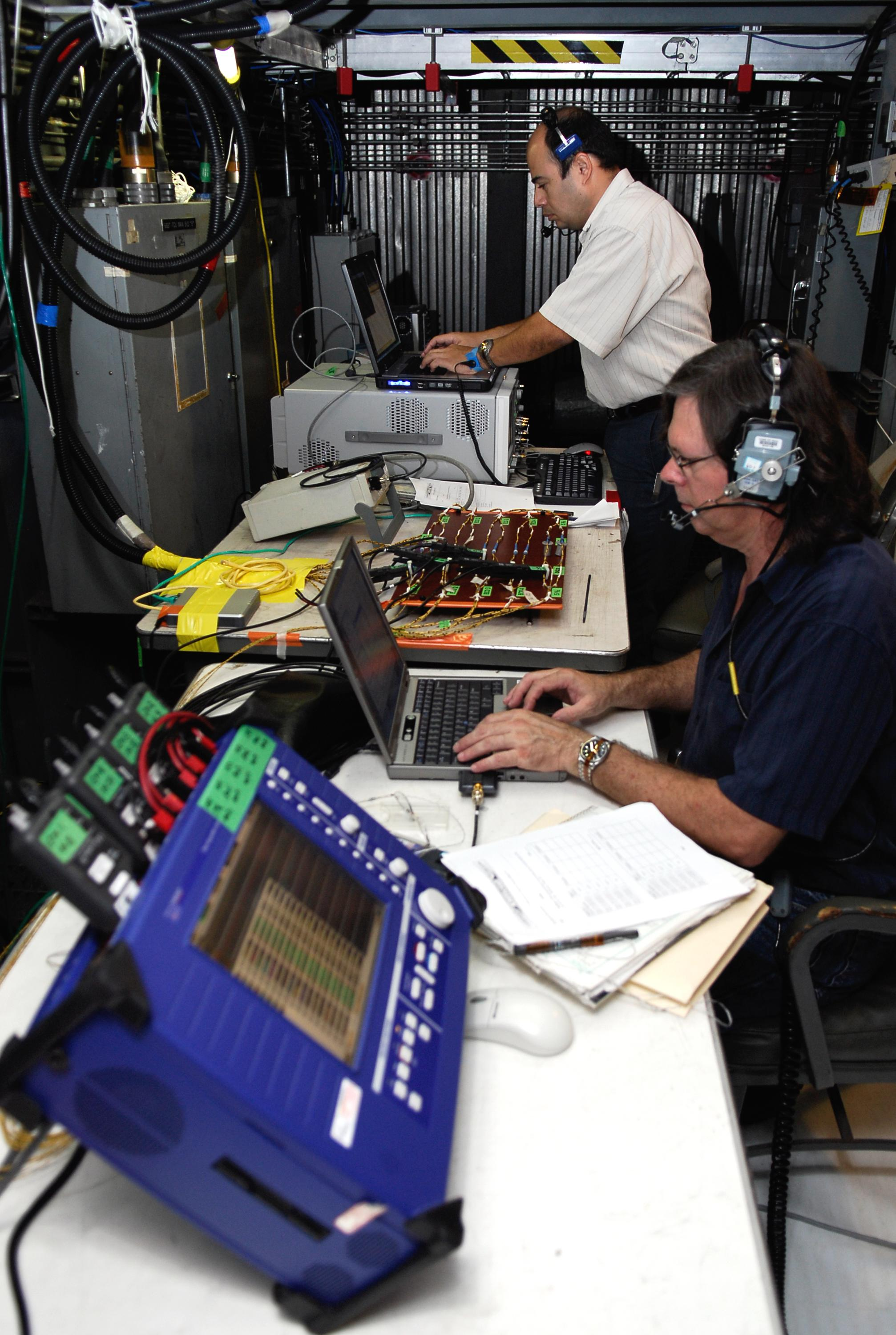
Engineers Peter Johnson and Dr. Carlos Mata working on the time-domain reflectometry equipment inside the MLP.

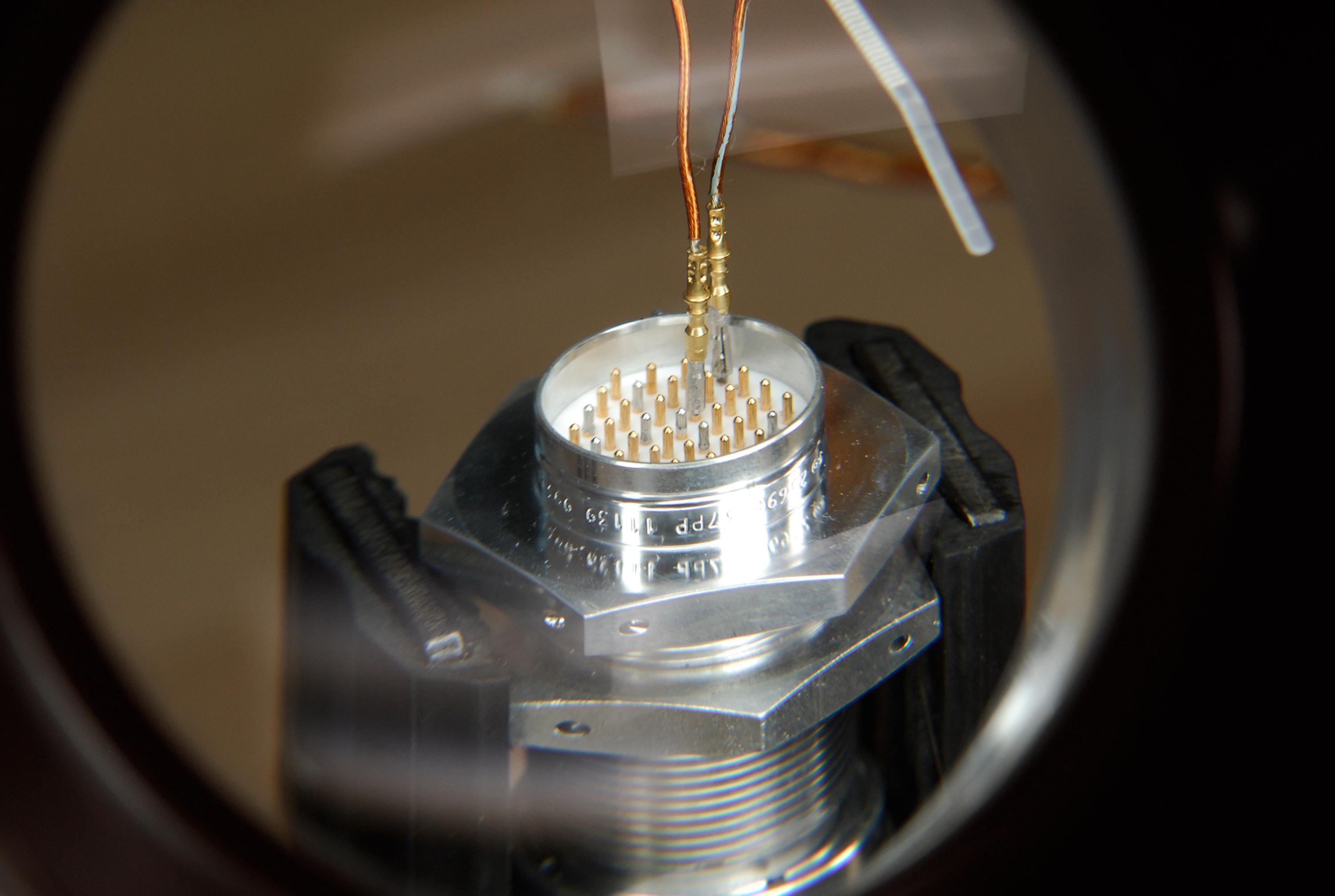
Close-up of the pin soldering process

Fueling of Atlantis began at 05:55 EST (10:55 UTC). During fueling at 06:52 EST, the third ECO sensor failed wet, violating the modified Launch Commit Criteria that required all four sensors to function properly. The launch was officially scrubbed at 07:25 EST (12:25 UTC). Troubleshooting the problem would rule out a December launch. NASA finally gave a new launch date of January 10, 2008.

During the post-scrub news conference, Launch Director Doug Lyons said that a rollback to the Vehicle Assembly Building was not a situation managers were considering currently, and explained that the pad offers extensive access to the systems for troubleshooting and investigation. "We can do extensive troubleshooting out there before we would entertain rolling back. There's not many things we can't do out at the launch pad that we could do in the VAB." Managers have convened a short-term troubleshooting team to design a plan to identify, and hopefully predict, or prevent the ECO anomaly.

=== ECO sensor troubleshooting and recovery ===
After the second failed launch attempt, NASA initiated a search for the root cause of the ECO sensor problem. In order to gather more data they scheduled a tanking test for December 18, 2007. Engineers installed test wiring that was leading from the tail mast of the orbiter into the interior of the Mobile Launcher Platform (MLP), where Time-domain reflectometry (TDR) test equipment was installed to test the ECO sensor system. Engineer Peter Johnson and Dr. Carlos T. Mata operated two TDRs to gather data about the characteristics of the behavior of the sensor circuitry before, during, and after tanking. NASA was able to pinpoint the problem to the LH2 external tank feed-through connector.

=== Radiator Retract Hose ===
During launch preparations at Kennedy, technicians noticed a small section of the aft radiator retract hose that was bent in a shape similar to the Greek letter Omega. The hose is part of the shuttle's cooling system that carries Freon, and is designed to flex when the payload bay doors are opened and closed. Making sure they were not overlooking potential problems, NASA engineers designed a tool to guide the hose back into the storage box, and performed the procedure on February 3, 2008. Engineers would monitor the hose during STS-122, and in the unlikely event that it were to begin leaking Freon, the shuttle's computers would turn off the redundant radiator system before any Freon had a chance to leak out.

Attempt	Planned	Result	Turnaround	Reason	Decision point	Weather go (%)	Notes
1	6 Dec 2007, 4:31:44 pm	Scrubbed	—	Technical	6 Dec 2007, 9:56 am	90%	Fault in Engine Cut Off (ECO) sensors.
2	9 Dec 2007, 3:21:00 pm	Scrubbed	2 days 22 hours 49 minutes	Technical	8 Dec 2007, 7:25 am	70%	Fault in Engine Cut Off (ECO) sensors.
3	7 Feb 2008, 2:45:30 pm	Success	59 days 23 hours 25 minutes			30%	

== Mission timeline ==
=== February 7 (Flight day 1, Launch) ===
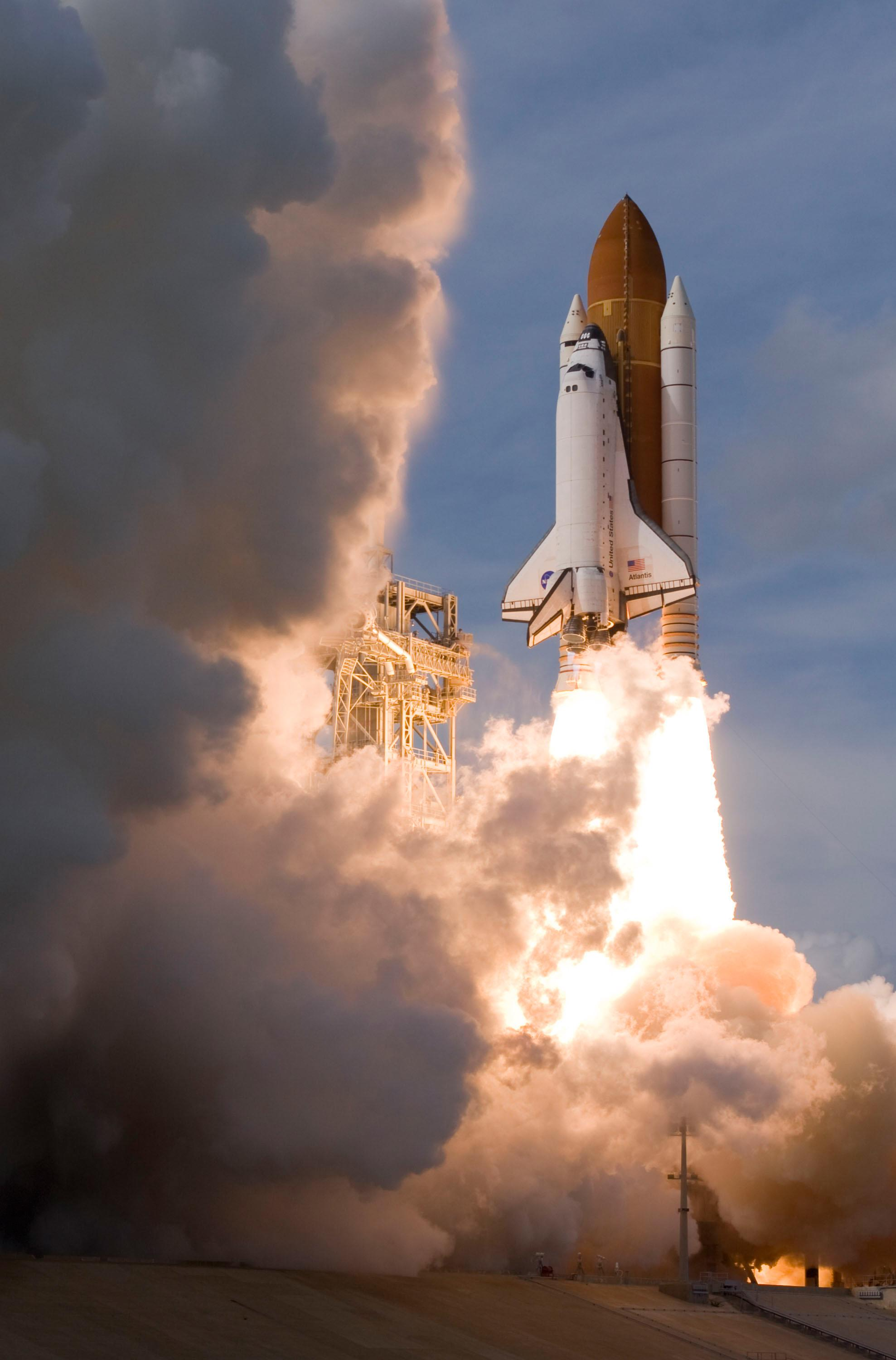
STS-122 begins its mission to deliver the Columbus laboratory to the International Space Station.

Fueling began at 05:26 EST, ahead of a planned 14:45 EST launch. The fuel sensors all performed as expected, and at 14:35 EST, Launch Director Doug Lyons gave Atlantis crewmembers the go to launch, with no constraints. Atlantis launched on schedule, at 14:45 EST (19:45 UTC). Main engine cutoff (MECO) occurred at 19:54 UTC. After MECO and ET separation, the orbiter executed an OMS-2 engine firing to circularize the orbit, and put it on track to the International Space Station. The crew opened the payload bay doors, deployed the K_{u} antenna, checked out and activated the shuttle's robotic arm, and downlinked the video footage taken during external tank separation to NASA managers.

=== February 8 (Flight day 2) ===
The crew of Atlantis spent the day performing a variety of tasks designed to prepare the shuttle for docking on Saturday, including the installation of the centerline camera, and the extension of the orbiter docking system ring. A majority of the day's activities was devoted to inspecting the shuttle's thermal protection system using the Orbiter Boom Sensor System (OBSS). Early in the morning, the crew performed a burn of the Orbital Maneuvering System (OMS) engines to adjust the orbit in preparation for docking with the International Space Station. During interviews with CBS and NBC in the morning, Expedition 16 Commander Peggy Whitson told reporters that since her birthday was Saturday, "My present is a new module that we're going to install on the station, I'm really looking forward to it."

During the afternoon mission status briefing at Johnson Space Center, Lead Shuttle Flight Director Mike Sarafin said that there were no technical issues, and the mission was on schedule for docking on Saturday at 17:25 UTC. He reported that the orbiter had sufficient consumables for a mission extension, but the decision on whether to extend the mission would be made no earlier than flight day five, to allow the team to evaluate the inspection data. If the mission were extended, Sarafin said the extra day would be inserted into day nine, following the third EVA. Chairman of the Mission Management Team (MMT) John Shannon reported that his team gave the official "go" for docking during their first on-orbit meeting. Shannon noted that the initial imagery given to the engineering team showed "absolutely nothing of concern", with only one foam piece appearing to possibly impact the vehicle, 440 seconds into ascent. Shannon said any item that late into ascent would not have enough energy to do any significant damage if it did strike the orbiter, and the managers did not consider it an issue. Shannon said the team would evaluate the data obtained during Saturday's Rendezvous Pitch Maneuver, performed prior to docking, as well as the imagery from the OBSS survey, and during flight day 3's MMT meeting a decision would be made whether a focused inspection of the orbiter's thermal protection system would be needed. Shannon noted that the improvements to the external tank have proven to be "phenomenal", and was pleased with the initial data.

=== February 9 (Flight day 3) ===
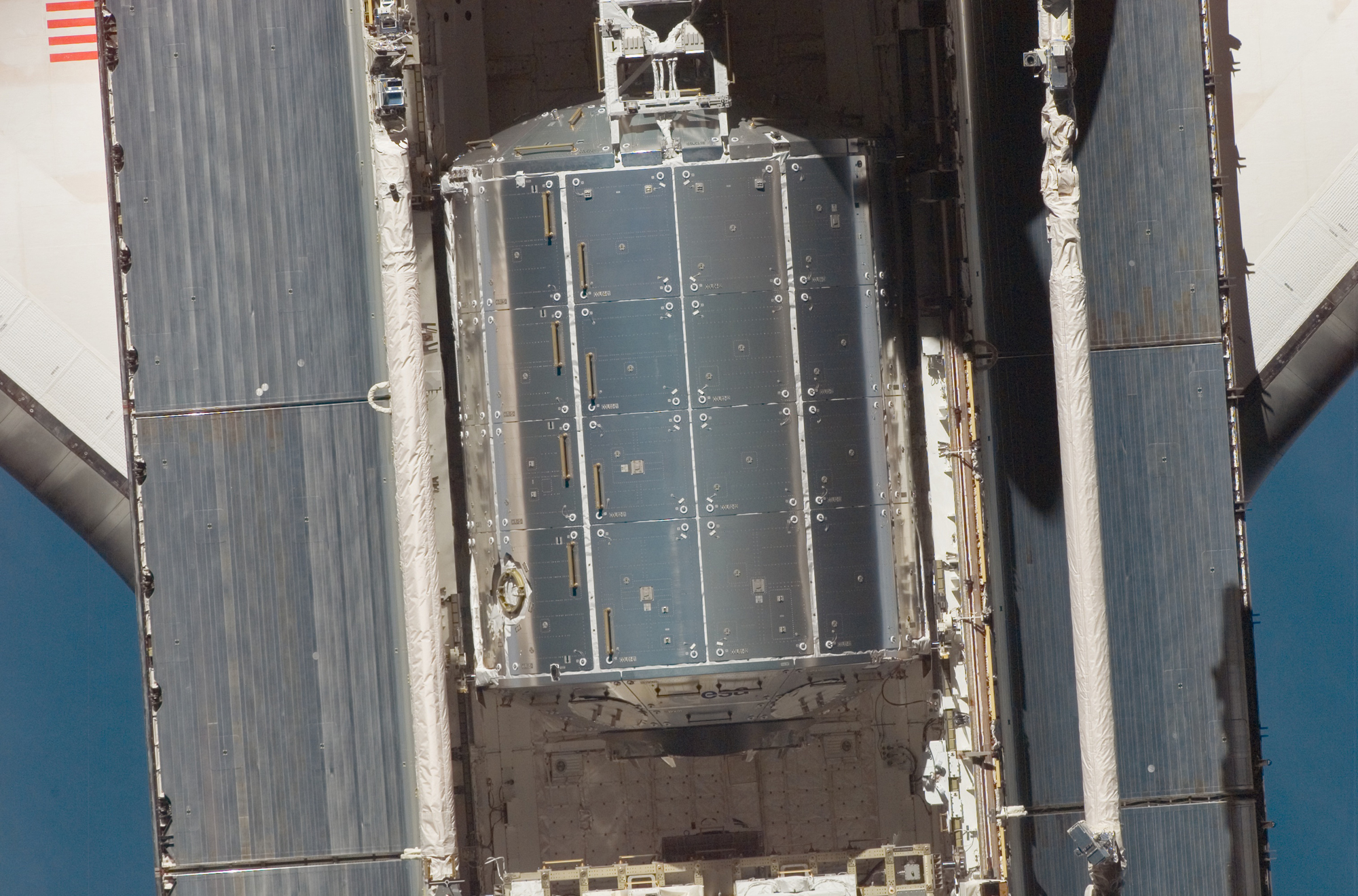
The Columbus module seen in high detail from the station, in this image taken by the Expedition 16 crew, during their photography of Atlantis prior to docking on flight day three.

The shuttle crew worked through the rendezvous timeline in the morning, including several adjustment burns of the orbiter's engines to refine the path towards the station. Between 16:24 and 16:31 UTC, Atlantis performed the Rendezvous Pitch Maneuver to allow the station crew to use high resolution cameras and document the thermal protection system. Extra images were taken of the starboard OMS pod as it was an "area of interest" due to the appearance of a raised blanket. Atlantis docked with station at 17:17 UTC (12:17 pm EST). Atlantis is the first orbiter to dock to the new position of the Pressurized Mating Adapter at the forward end of the Harmony module.

After working through a variety of leak check procedures, the hatches were opened between the shuttle and station at 18:40 UTC, and the two crews exchanged greetings and conducted a mandatory safety briefing. After the briefing, they began the rest of the day's tasks, including moving the station's robotic arm to grapple the OBSS, and then hand it off to the shuttle's robotic arm in preparation for future activities. The official exchange of Expedition 16 crewmembers Daniel Tani and Eyharts was completed in the evening, when they exchanged their Soyuz custom made seat liners, and Tani became a member of the STS-122 crew, while Eyharts began his position as flight engineer for Expedition 16.

During the mission status briefing, Flight Director Mike Sarafin stated that one of the three General Purpose Computers (GPC) failed to start up correctly before the rendezvous, but it did not impact the rendezvous. Sarafin also confirmed that they were investigating a slight tear in the thermal protection blanket on the starboard (right side) OMS pod.

At 20:14 UTC, the ground team radioed the crew to alert them that the managers had decided to make a 24-hour delay to EVA-1, originally scheduled for Flight Day 4, and that Stanley Love would replace Hans Schlegel for EVA-1 on Monday. During the post-MMT briefing, Mission Management Chairman John Shannon explained there was a "crew medical issue", but it would not impact the mission objectives. For reasons of medical privacy, Shannon said NASA can not disclose which crewmember is affected, and no details would be given as to the nature of the issue, but Shannon said it was not something to be concerned about. Unconfirmed news reports claim that Schlegel had "lost his voice", and since communication is a critical function of an EVA, the decision to swap crewmembers was made. Shannon also noted that Atlantis has enough consumables to extend almost two days; the mission operations team was looking at procedures to assist with power conservation, and the team hopes to add another day extension to the mission.

=== February 10 (Flight day 4) ===
The two crews spent their first joint mission day working through a focused inspection of the OMS pod blanket, reviewing the upcoming EVA procedures, and beginning the transfer of items from the shuttle to the station. Earlier in the day, ESA confirmed the crewmember with the medical condition was Schlegel, but stated it was nothing serious and does not impact the health of any of the other crewmembers. Tani and Eyharts spent several hours working through a variety of station familiarization procedures, designed to assist Eyharts in learning where items are on the station. Love, Walheim and Schlegel were given several hours in their daily timeline to go over the EVA. Walheim and Love will spend the night in the Quest airlock in preparation for Monday's EVA.

During the mission status briefing, MMT Chairman John Shannon stated that the rest of the mission will follow the plan, with no changes expected. Commenting on the ongoing thermal protection system review, Shannon said "The thermal protection system inspections that we do are going extremely well, it's the fastest I've ever seen them done on a flight. We have completely cleared the bottom of the orbiter, there are no issues we are working on the bottom, and all of the reinforced carbon-carbon on the wings and the nose are completely cleared. We're gathering additional information on the right OMS pod. Atlantis is extremely clean." The blanket would be evaluated more on Monday, and a decision regarding that area is expected to be made at the MMT meeting Monday evening. There were a few areas of interest around the windows that were also being evaluated.

=== February 11 (Flight day 5) ===
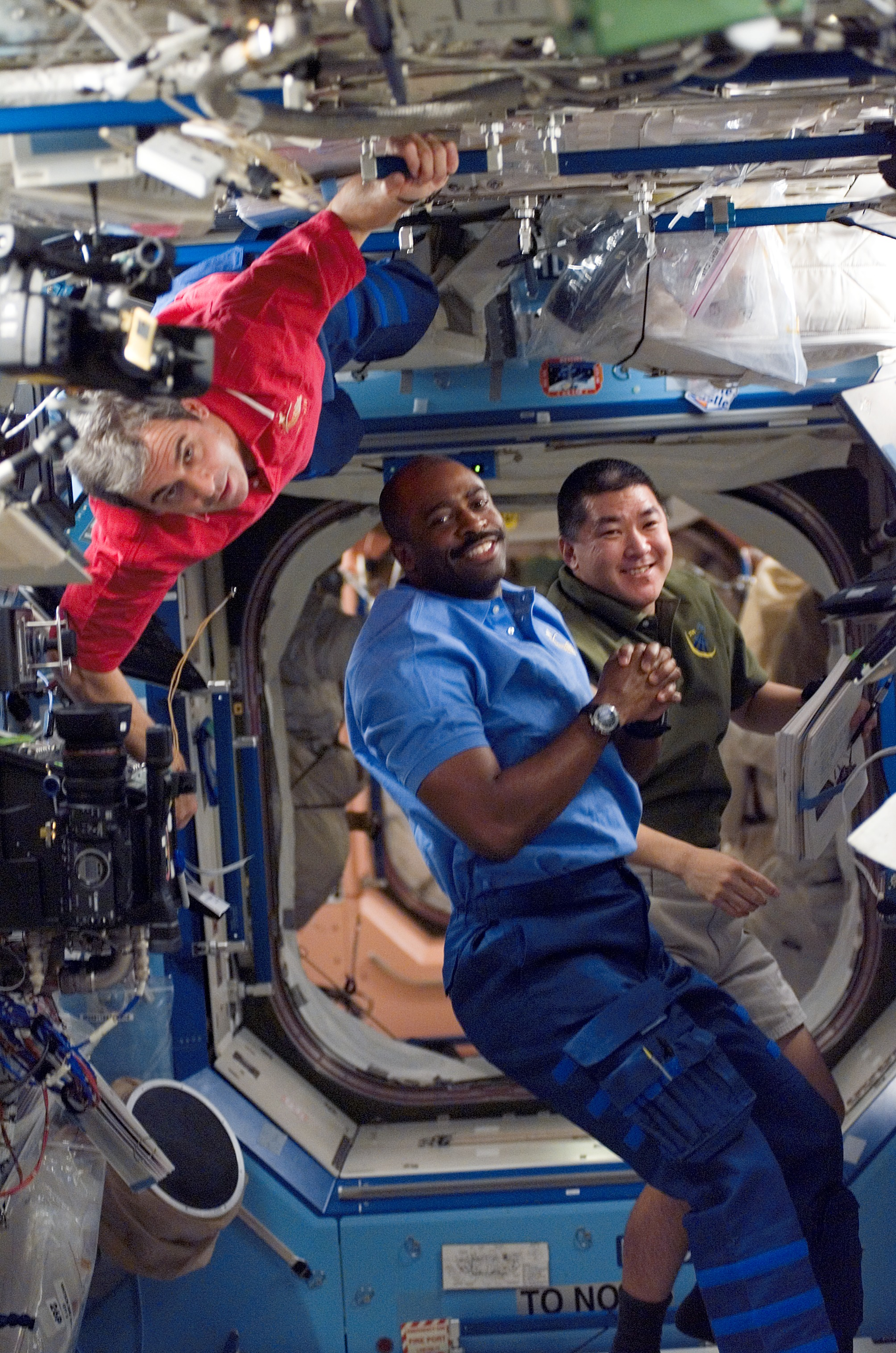
Leland Melvin and mission specialists working on robotic equipment in the US lab

After awakening, both crews began preparing for the mission's first spacewalk. Love and Walheim suited up, and the EVA began slightly ahead of schedule, at 14:13 UTC (09:13 EST). Assisting the spacewalkers inside the station and shuttle were pilot Alan Poindexter, and Mission Specialist Hans Schlegel.

At 19:53 UTC (14:53 EST), Walheim and Love completed the preparations for the unberthing of Columbus from the payload bay, and with Melvin inside the space station working the robotic arm, the module was successfully lifted out of the payload bay. The first contact of Columbus with the station was at 21:29, and at 21:44, Eyharts and Melvin announced that Columbus was officially installed on its new home in orbit. "Houston and Munich, the European Columbus laboratory module is now part of the ISS," Eyharts radioed to the ground. Walheim and Love began the re-pressurization of the Quest airlock at 22:11 UTC (17:11 EST), which marked the official end of their 7-hour, 58 minute EVA.

=== February 12 (Flight day 6) ===
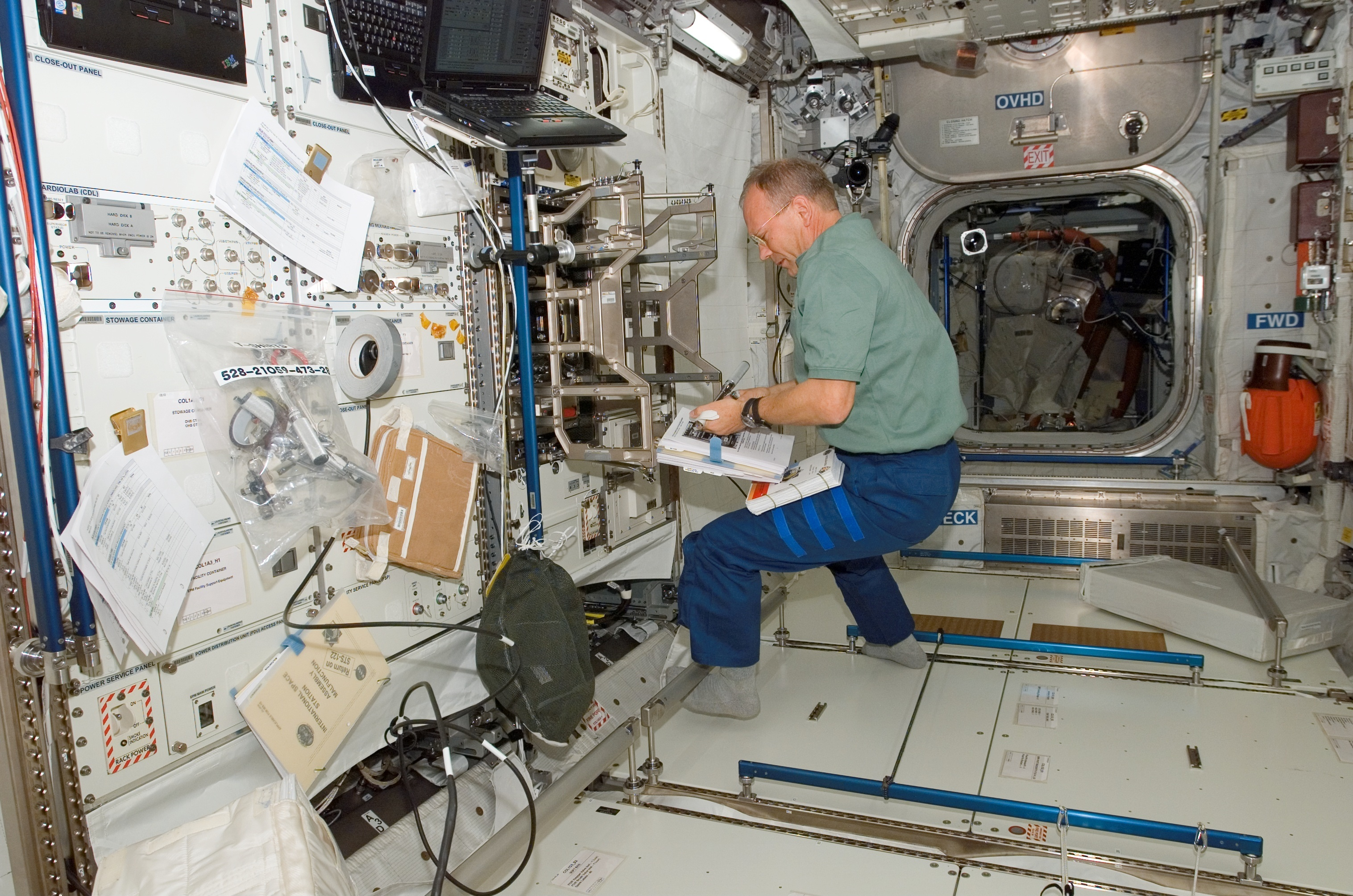
Hans Schlegel is working on outfitting Columbus.

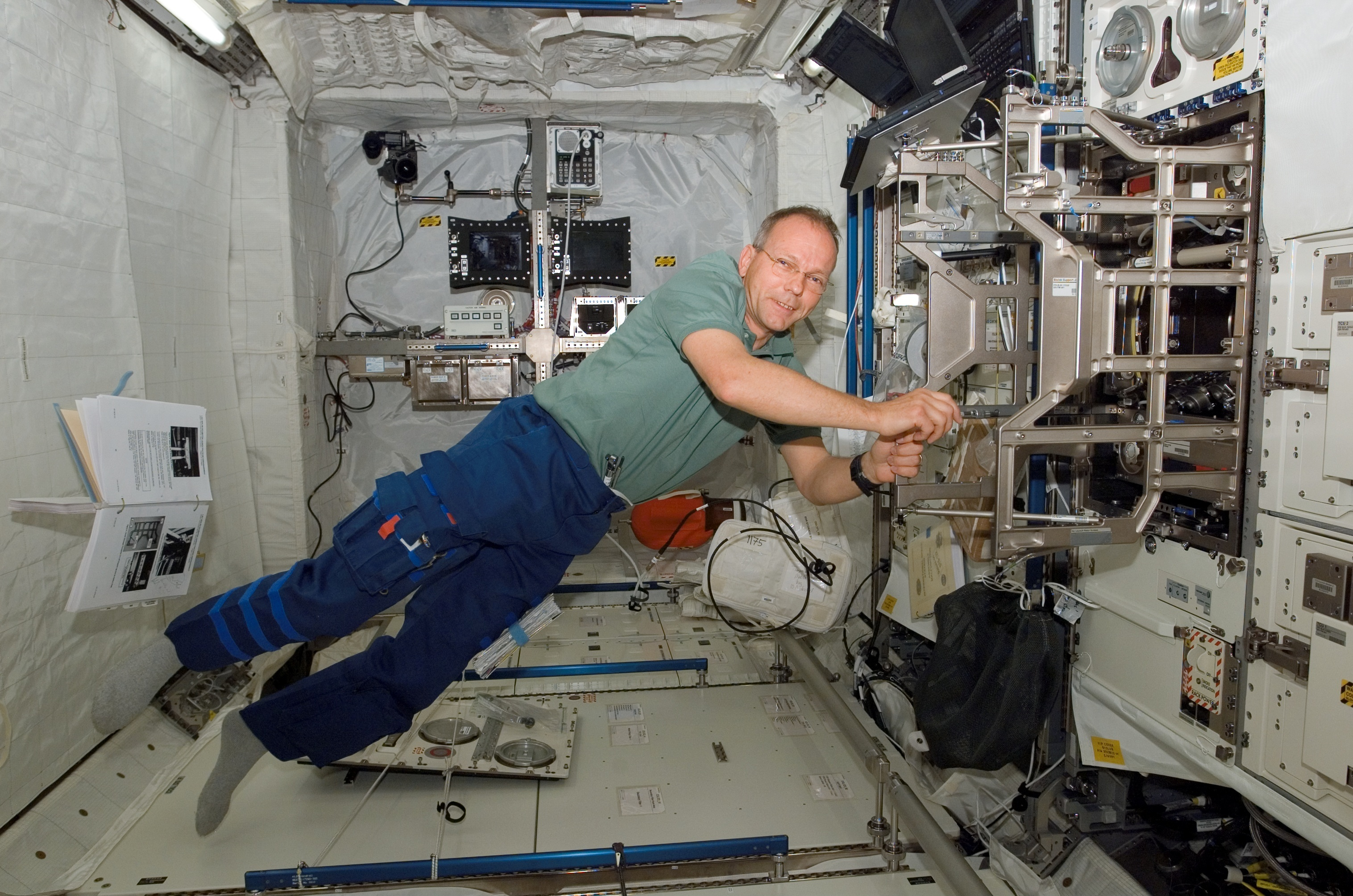
A view at the cone end of Columbus.

The two crews spent the day working to activate and outfit the newest addition to the station, the Columbus module. After the ground conducted a variety of leak checks during the crew's sleep period the night before, the crew was given the go ahead to put the module into what is called "Berth Survival Mode", which is a "functional mode": A minimal healthy configuration that can be maintained for extended time periods, if required. This involved powering up basic computers, power distribution units, and heaters. The crew completed the Berth Survival Mode activation quickly, and moved on to final activation. Representing the European partners, Schlegel and Eyharts were the first crewmembers to enter the module, performing a partial ingress at 14:08 UTC (09:08 EST). Eyharts told the team on the ground, "We have a special thought at this moment for all the people in Europe and the U.S. who have contributed to the make up of Columbus. Especially to the space agencies, of course, the industry, but also all the citizens who are supporting space flight. This is a great moment, and Hans and I are very proud to be here and to ingress for the first time the Columbus module."

By the afternoon, after allowing the circulation fans to work for several hours to clean out any residual particulates in the air, crewmembers were going in and out, working on hooking up water, thermal controls, and command and monitoring units. During the afternoon's mission status briefing, ISS Orbit One Flight Director Bob Dempsey noted that the two crews were far ahead of the timeline for activation, and excited about the station's new addition.

In the early evening, the ground team radioed the crew to let Commander Frick know that the Mission Management Team had officially cleared the right OMS pod blanket for return "as-is", and there were no safety concerns. The crew of Atlantis also took some time out to talk to reporters on the ground, one session in the morning, and another in the afternoon with CBS News, and Pittsburgh television stations. Frick, a native of Pittsburgh, Schlegel, and Poindexter participated in the afternoon interviews. Asked how he was feeling, Schlegel said he was proud to be a part of the mission to deliver Columbus, that the "big mission" was what mattered, and he was feeling fine and ready to perform the mission's second EVA. Walheim and Schlegel spent the night in the station's airlock in preparation for Wednesday's EVA.

=== February 13 (Flight day 7) ===
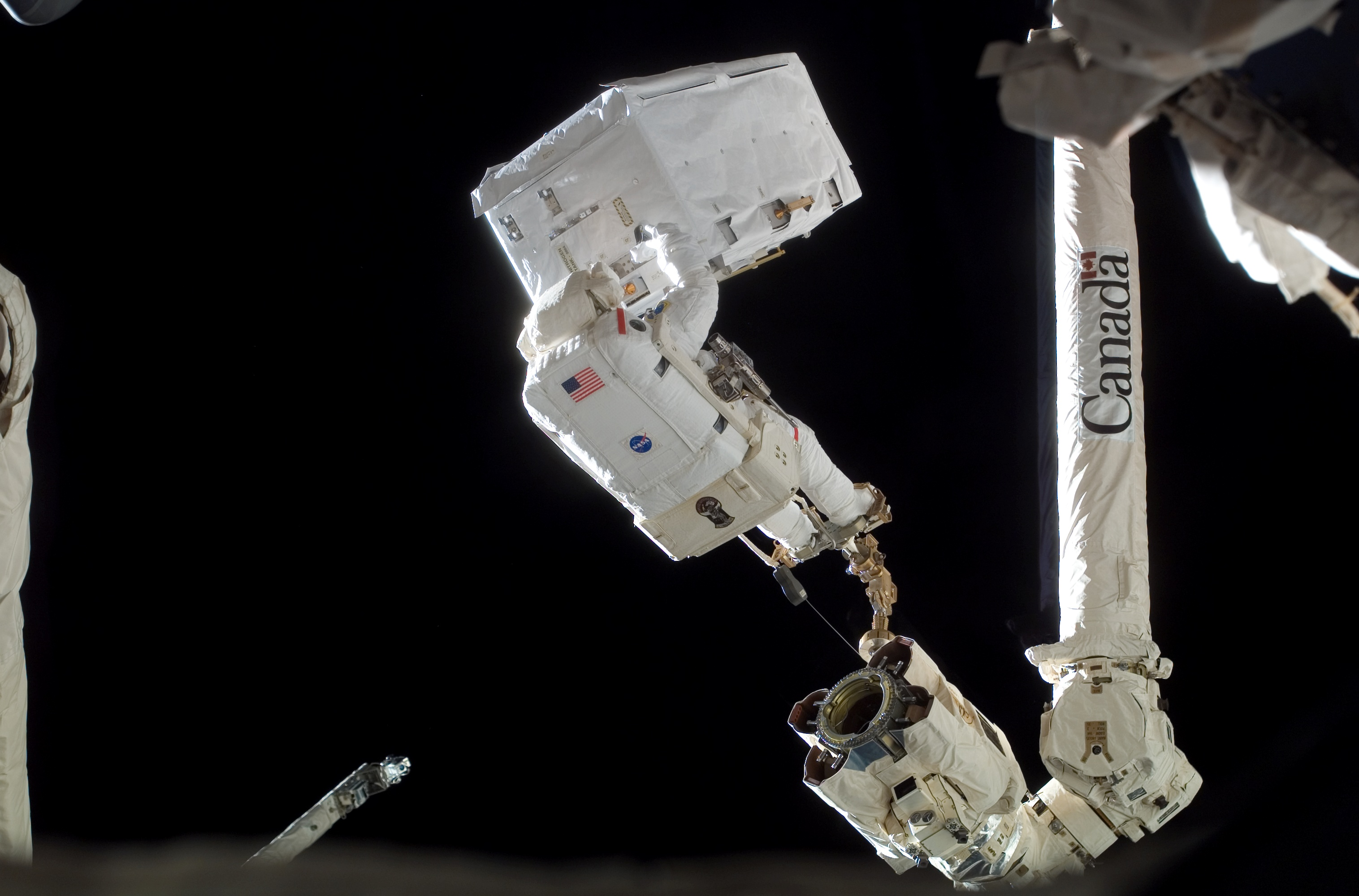
Rex Walheim moves a Nitrogen tank.

After awakening, the station and shuttle crews began working on preparing for the second EVA. Station Commander Whitson and shuttle Commander Frick assisted Walheim and Schlegel in suiting up and working through the pre-EVA procedures. Eyharts and the rest of the crew aboard the station continued their work on outfitting and activating the new Columbus module, as well as working on transferring items between the shuttle and the station. The second EVA began officially at 14:27 UTC (09:27 EST) and ended at 21:12 UTC (16:12 EST). Walheim and Schlegel replaced a near empty Nitrogen Tank Assembly of the P1 truss with a new full tank that was brought in orbit by STS-122.

During the mission status briefing, Lead ISS Flight Director Sally Davis announced that the managers had officially approved an additional docked day extension, and the team had also cleared the orbiter's entire thermal protection system for re-entry, pending late inspection results. The right OMS pod blanket was determined to be of no issue for re-entry the day before, and the areas around the orbiter's windows that appeared damaged were fully cleared. A tile that fell off during launch from the left Reaction Control System engine, called a "LOMS stinger tile" was deemed to be from a non-critical area, and was also cleared.

=== February 14 (Flight day 8) ===
The two crews had a light day scheduled, designed to give the crew some rest after a busy week of activities. Several media interviews were conducted, including interviews with NBC News and a number of radio stations, as well as a special ESA event, a VIP call with German Chancellor Angela Merkel who called to congratulate Eyharts and Schlegel, as representatives of the European Space Agency on the successful delivery and installation of the Columbus module to the station. The joint crews also did some maintenance tasks, including a waste water dump from the shuttle, transfer activities, and continued work on outfitting and activating the Columbus module. Both crews participated in an EVA review in the late afternoon, and Walheim and Love spent the night in the station's airlock in preparation for the mission's final spacewalk.

=== February 15 (Flight day 9) ===
After awakening at 08:45 UTC, Walheim and Love spent the morning preparing for the mission's final spacewalk, assisted by Whitson and Frick, while the rest of the crew worked on Columbus outfitting, transfers, and preparation for robotics support during the EVA. The third EVA officially began at 13:07 UTC (08:07 EST) and ended at 20:32 UTC (15:32 EST).

=== February 16 (Flight day 10) ===
While the ongoing task of outfitting the Columbus module continued, Atlantis' propulsion system was fired for 36 minutes to reboost the station's altitude by 1.4 miles (2.2 kilometers) in preparation for the arrival of Space Shuttle Endeavour during STS-123. Also, all members of the shuttle and station crews participated in news conferences with American and European media.

=== February 17 (Flight day 11) ===
Hatches between Atlantis and the ISS were closed at 18:03 GMT.

=== February 18 (Flight day 12) ===
Atlantis undocked from the ISS at 9:24 UTC (4:24 am EST).

=== February 19 (Flight day 13) ===
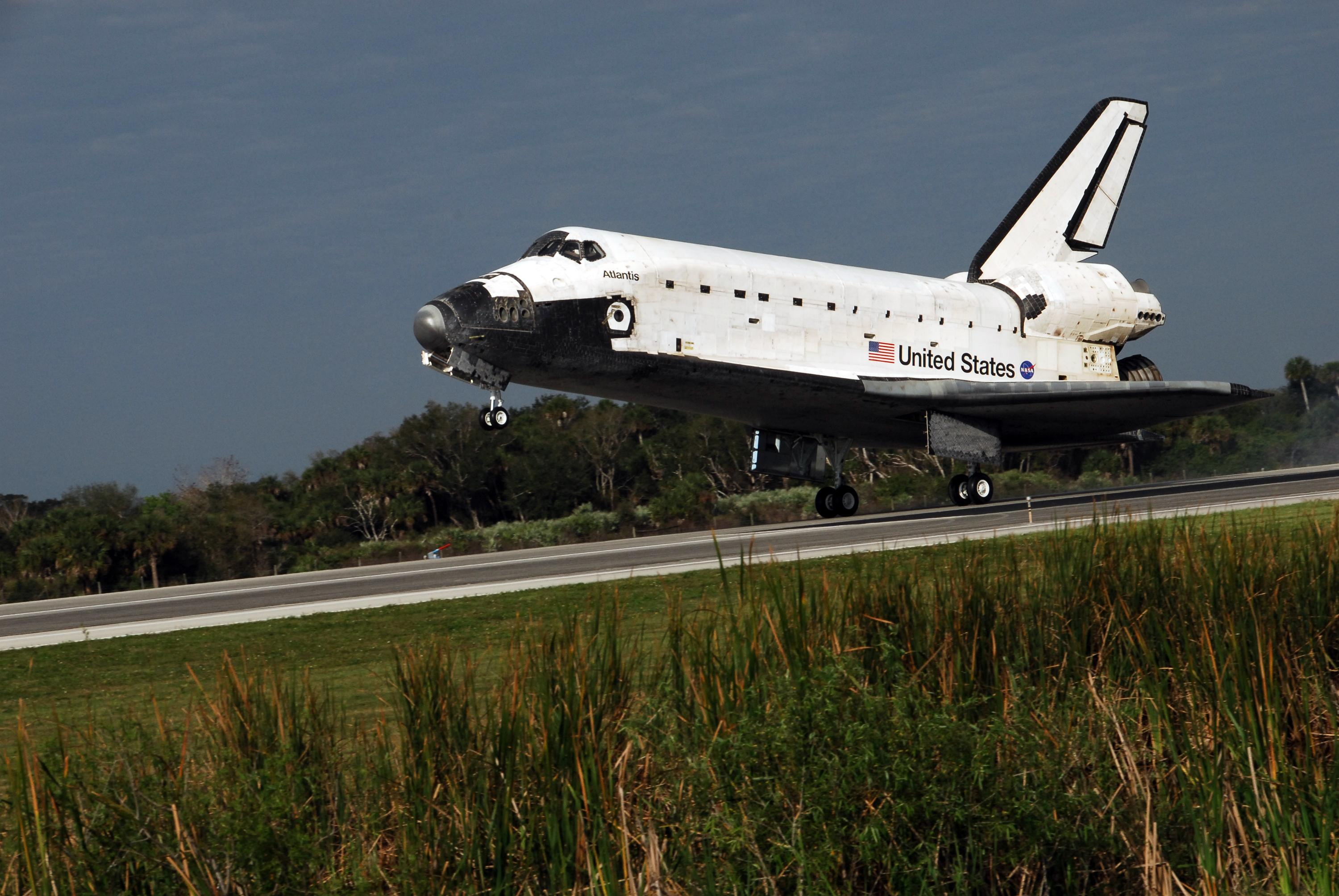
Atlantis lands on runway 15 at the Kennedy Space Center.

The crew performed final inspections and preparations prior to landing.

=== February 20 (Flight day 14, Landing) ===
The crew were cleared to close Atlantis' payload bay doors at 10:14 UTC, and this was completed by 10:28 UTC. At 12:32 UTC, NASA cleared Atlantis to land on its first opportunity at KSC. A two-minute-43-second de-orbit burn was conducted, beginning at 13:00 UTC. This was followed by entry interface at 13:35 UTC. Atlantis touched down on Runway 15 of the Shuttle Landing Facility at 9:07 am EST (14:07:10 UTC), approximately 12 days, 18 hours, 21 minutes and 40 seconds into the mission. Wheel stop occurred at 09:08 EST (14:08:08 UTC).

== Extra-vehicular activity ==
Three spacewalks were scheduled and completed during STS-122. The cumulative time in extra-vehicular activity during the mission was 22 hours, 8 minutes.

EVA	Spacewalkers	Start (UTC)	End	Duration	Mission
1	Rex J. Walheim; Stanley G. Love	February 11, 2008; 14:13	February 11, 2008; 22:11	7h 58m	P1 truss nitrogen (N2) tank assembly preparation, power and data grapple fixture removal and installation to Columbus.
2	Rex J. Walheim; Hans Schlegel	February 13, 2008; 14:27	February 13, 2008; 21:12	6h 45m	P1 Truss Nitrogen (N2) tank assembly installation, stowage of old N2 tank assembly into payload bay, Station-to-Shuttle Power Transfer System (SSPTS) routing.
3	Rex J. Walheim; Stanley G. Love	February 15, 2008; 13:07	February 15, 2008; 20:32	7h 25m	Installation of SOLAR telescope, and EuTEF facility onto an External Stowage Platform (ESP) on Columbus, retrieval of failed Control Moment Gyroscope (CMG) that was replaced on STS-118 and stowed on ESP2, installation of failed CMG into payload bay, installation of keel pin cloth covers on Columbus, inspection and imaging of handrail outside airlock, and testing with overglove and velcro tool for rough areas.

== Wake-up calls ==
NASA began a tradition of playing music to astronauts during the Gemini program, which was first used to wake up a flight crew during Apollo 15. Each track is specially chosen, often by their families, and usually has a special meaning to an individual member of the crew, or is applicable to their daily activities.

Flight Day	Song	Artist/Composer	Played for	Links
Day 2	"Book of Love"	Peter Gabriel	Léopold Eyharts	wav mp3 Transcript
Day 3	"The Prairie Home Companion Theme Song"	Pat Donohue and Guy's All-Star Shoe Band and Garrison Keillor	Steve Frick	wav mp3 Transcript
Day 4	"Maenner"	Herbert Groenemeyer	Hans Schlegel	wav mp3 Transcript
Day 5	"Fly Like an Eagle"	Steve Miller Band	Leland Melvin	wav mp3 Transcript
Day 6	"Dream Come True"	Jim Brickman	Rex Walheim	wav mp3 Transcript
Day 7	"Oysters and Pearls"	Jimmy Buffett	Alan Poindexter	wav mp3 Transcript
Day 8	"Consider Yourself (at Home)"	Lionel Bart	Stanley G. Love	wav mp3 Transcript
Day 9	"Marmor Stein und Eisen Bricht"	Drafi Deutscher	Hans Schlegel	wav mp3 Transcript
Day 10	"I Believe I Can Fly"	Yolanda Adams and Kenny G	Leland Melvin	wav mp3 Transcript
Day 11	"Hail Thee, Harvey Mudd"	Amy Lewkowicz	Stanley G. Love	wav mp3 Transcript
Day 12	"Over the Rainbow"/"What a Wonderful World"	Israel Kamakawiwo'ole	Dan Tani	wav mp3 Transcript
Day 13	"Always Look on the Bright Side of Life"	Eric Idle	Steve Frick	wav mp3 Transcript
Day 14	"Hail to the Spirit of Liberty"	John Philip Sousa	Alan Poindexter	wav mp3 Transcript

== Media ==
Space Shuttle Atlantis launches from launch pad 39A at Kennedy Space Center as part of the STS-122 mission

== See also ==
- 2008 in spaceflight
- List of human spaceflights
- List of International Space Station spacewalks
- List of Space Shuttle missions
- Lists of spacewalks and moonwalks
- Space Shuttle program
