= Stanley G. Love =

American astronaut (born 1965)

Stanley Love
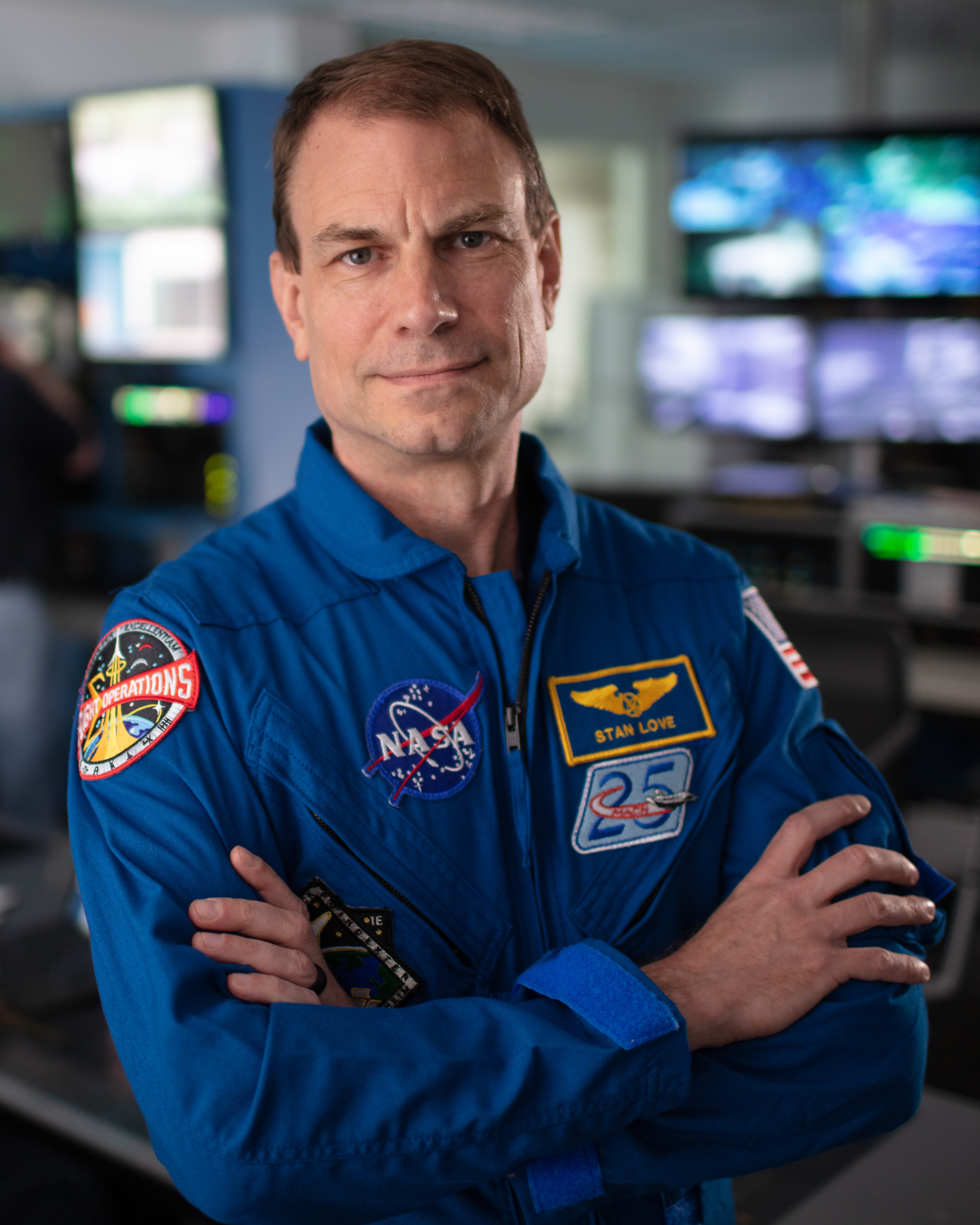
- Love in 2019
- Born: June 8, 1965 (age 61); San Diego, California, U.S.
- Education: Harvey Mudd College (BS); University of Washington (MS, PhD)
- Space career

NASA astronaut
- Time in space: 12 days, 18 hours, 22 minutes
- Selection: NASA Group 17 (1998)
- Total EVAs: 2
- Total EVA time: 15 hours, 23 minutes
- Missions: STS-122
- Scientific career
- Fields: Astronomy
- Thesis: The Source of Interplanetary Dust (1993)

Stanley Glen Love (born June 8, 1965) is an American scientist and a NASA astronaut from Oregon.

== Early life ==
Love was born on June 8, 1965, to Glen A. Love and Rhoda M. Love in San Diego, California. However, Love has stated he considers Eugene, Oregon, to be his hometown. Love graduated from Winston Churchill High School in Eugene, Oregon, in 1983. He received a Bachelor of Science degree in physics from Harvey Mudd College in Claremont, California (1987), and M.S. (1989) and Ph.D. degrees (1993) from the University of Washington in Astronomy.

== Academic career ==
Love worked at the University of Oregon as a computer programming instructor during the summer of 1984 and as an assistant in physics and chemistry laboratories from 1985 to 1987. As a graduate teaching assistant at the University of Washington in Seattle beginning in 1987, he taught undergraduate classes in general and planetary astronomy. He worked as a graduate research assistant at the University of Washington from 1989 to 1993. He moved to the University of Hawaii in 1994 for postdoctoral research. In 1995, he was awarded a postdoctoral prize from the California Institute of Technology. In 1997, he went to work as a staff engineer at the Jet Propulsion Laboratory.

== NASA career ==
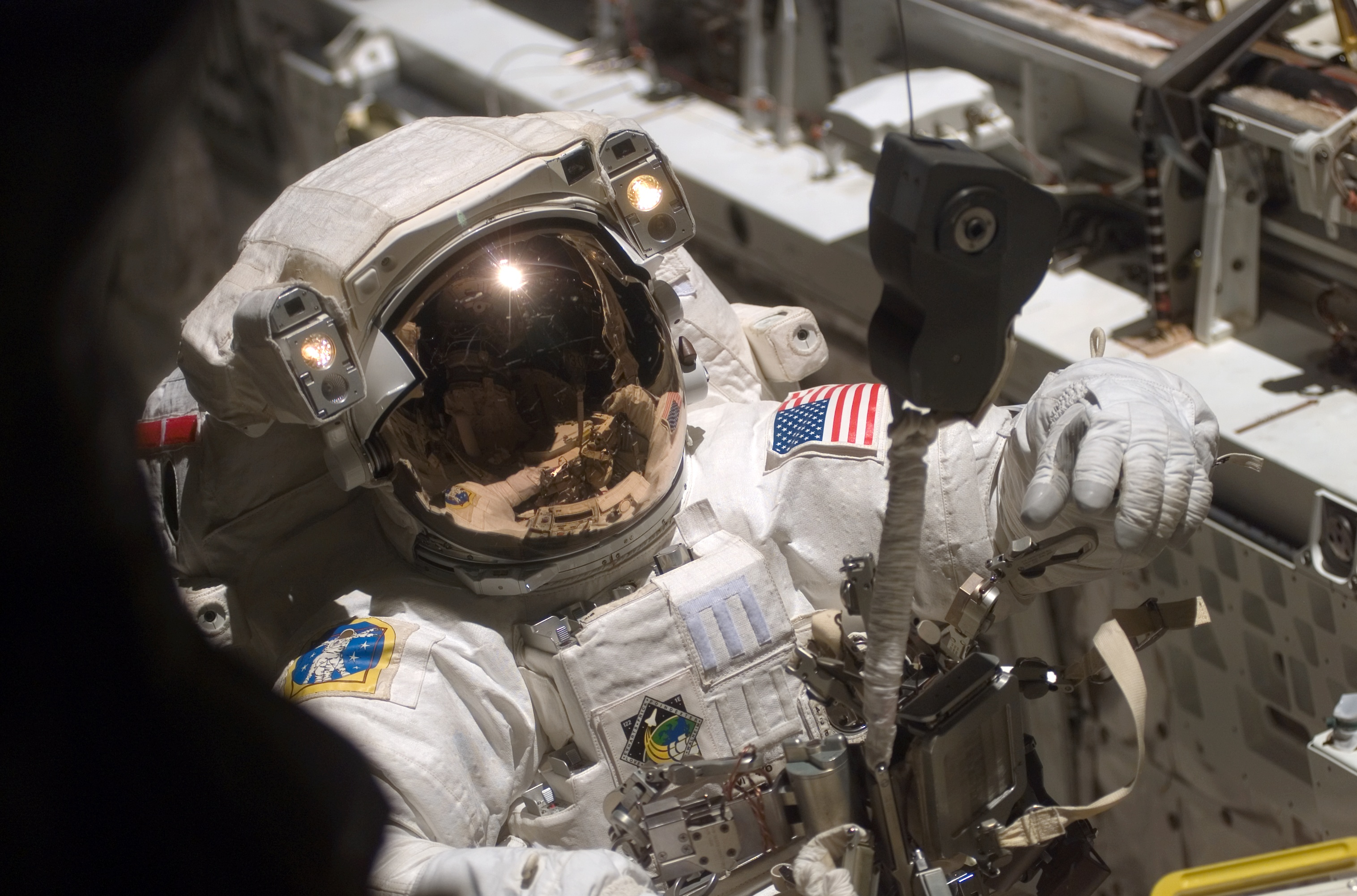
Love during a spacewalk during STS-122

Love joined NASA in June 1998 and started training in August of that year. Love completed both basic astronaut candidate training and advanced training. He served as a CAPCOM (spacecraft communicator) in Mission Control for Station Expeditions 1 through 7 and for Space Shuttle missions STS-104, STS-108, STS-112 and STS-132. In 2008, Love participated in his first spaceflight with the crew of STS-122 aboard Space Shuttle Atlantis and logged over 306 hours in space, including two EVAs. The mission began on February 7, 2008, and ended on February 20, 2008.

On September 19, 2011, NASA announced that Love would participate in the NEEMO 15 undersea exploration mission in October 2011 from the DeepWorker 2000 submersible. The DeepWorker is a small submarine used as an underwater stand-in for the Space Exploration Vehicle, which might someday be used to explore the surface of an asteroid. However, because NEEMO 15 ended early due to the approach of Hurricane Rina, Love was not able to pilot the DeepWorker during the mission. Love was able to pilot the DeepWorker during the NEEMO 16 mission in June 2012, during which he experienced an interesting incident when his submersible became pinned against the bottom of the support vessel Liberty Star.

As of May 2019, Love is a management astronaut, which means he is no longer eligible for flight assignment. Love works as the Deputy Chief of the Astronaut Office's Rapid Prototying Laboratory, developing cockpit displays and controls for Orion and forthcoming spacecraft.

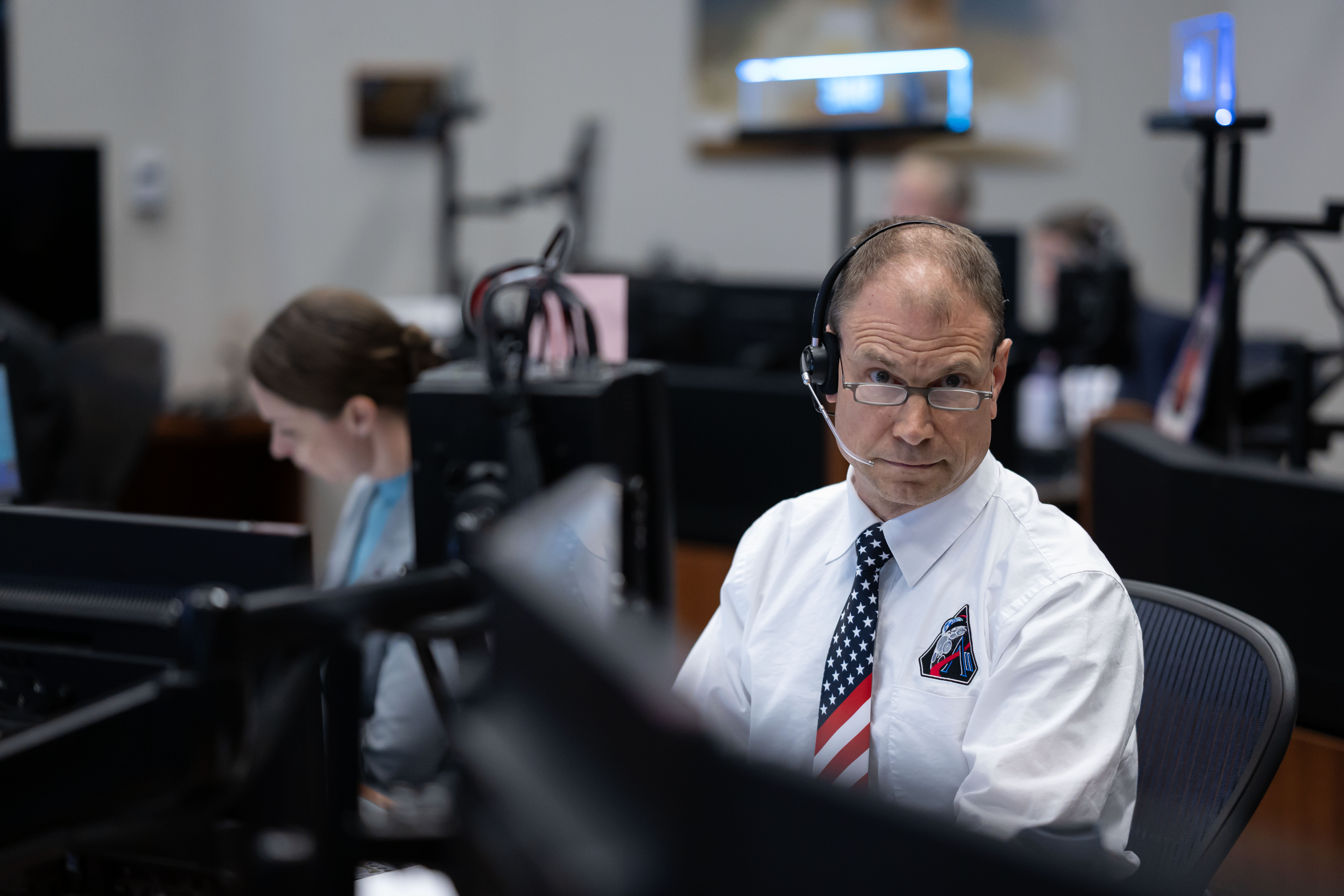
Love sits on console during the Artemis II launch

Love served as lead CAPCOM for the Artemis II mission.

=== Spaceflight ===
STS-122 Atlantis (February 7–20, 2008) was the 24th shuttle mission to visit the International Space Station. The primary objective of the flight was to carry the European Space Agency’s Columbus Laboratory module to the Space Station and install it there permanently. Love performed two spacewalks to help prepare the Columbus Laboratory for installation, to add two science payloads to the outside of Columbus, and to carry a failed Station gyroscope to the Shuttle for return to Earth. STS-122 was also a crew replacement mission, delivering Expedition 16 Flight Engineer Léopold Eyharts, and returning home with Expedition 16 Flight Engineer Daniel Tani. The STS-122 mission was accomplished in 12 days, 18 hours, 21 minutes, and 39 seconds, and traveled 5,296,842 miles (8,524,441 km; 4,602,830 nmi) in 203 Earth orbits.

== Memberships ==
Love's memberships include the American Astronomical Society; Division for Planetary Science; the American Geophysical Union; the American Institute of Aeronautics and Astronautics (Associate Fellow); the Meteoritical Society; and the Harvey Mudd College Alumni Association.

== Personal life ==
Love is married to Jancy McPhee, a NASA scientist. They have two children. Love has a wide range of hobbies, including martial arts, hiking, science fiction, music, and anime.
