= Ohnesorge =

Ohnesorge is a German-language surname whose literal meaning is "without worry", i.e., "carefree." Ohnesorge may refer to:

- Ohnesorge number, a dimensionless quantity in fluid dynamics
- Wilhelm Ohnesorge, member of Nazi cabinet
- Cory Ohnesorge, American football punter
- Lena Ohnesorge, German politician

== See also ==
- Benno Ohnesorg
