= Lisa Van Gemert =

American educationalist and author

- Born: 6 October 1966 (age 59); California

Lisa Paige Van Gemert (born October 6, 1966) is an American educationalist and author best known for her books about gifted education and her tenure as the first Youth and Education Ambassador for American Mensa.

== Early life ==
Van Gemert was born Lisa Paige Morey on October 6, 1966, in Newport Beach, California. She is an only child. She attended and graduated from El Camino High School in Oceanside, California. Her mother Margaret was a banker and federal credit union examiner until her retirement. Her father Richard Morey was a commercial landscaper and owner of Energy Construction Company.

She is an active member of the Church of Jesus Christ of Latter-day Saints.

Van Gemert’s interest in gifted education stems from her own experiences in California’s gifted education program for students scoring in the 98th percentile. She was identified for the program, at the time called MGM for Mentally Gifted Minors, later changing to GATE, when she was in 6th grade through the administration of a Stanford-Binet LM. She has spoken widely of her experience with the evaluation, describing it as her favorite day of school.

She graduated summa cum laude from the Honors College at the University of Texas at Arlington in 2002 with a bachelor’s degree in English. She received the Honors College Bridge to Graduate School Fellowship and earned her Master’s in Education (M.Ed.T.) in 2005 from the same institution. She also did graduate work in educational administration to earn her certification in principalship.

== Career ==
Van Gemert began teaching at Roquemore Elementary in Arlington, Texas, and then at Lamar High School in the same city. She eventually became an assistant principal at Martin High School. It was while teaching that she began speaking at conferences. She earned the 2005 ACES award for the best paper presented by a liberal arts graduate student while at UTA.

In 2007 she began working for American Mensa on a part-time basis, and in 2010 became their Gifted Youth Specialist, a title that shifted to Youth & Education Ambassador.

While at Mensa, she served as an expert consult to the Lifetime series Child Genius, appearing with Timothy Gunn and Leland Melvin for the series' two seasons. For both seasons, she served as the commentator, offering insight into the behavior of the contestants and their parents. For one episode each season she also appeared as Mensa's official representative. In addition to her appearances on the show, she was the expert consulted by media outlets reporting on the contestants.

== Writing ==
In 2013, Van Gemert published a novel, Loving Longest, a modern retelling of Persuasion by Jane Austen.

In 2017, she published her first non-fiction book in the field of gifted education, Perfectionism: A practical Guide to Managing Never Good Enough with Great Potential Press. The book won the TAGT Legacy Award in 2018.

In 2018 she published Living Gifted: 52 Tips to Survive and Thrive in Giftedland. In 2019, she wrote Gifted Guild’s Guide to Depth & Complexity with co-author and fellow Gifted Guild founder Ian Byrd. In 2020, she published her first book on academic vocabulary, Concept Capsules: The Interactive, Research-based Strategy for Teaching Academic Vocabulary.

== Personal life ==
Van Gemert married Eric Kline in 1988, and they had three sons. They later divorced. She married Australian software developer Steven Van Gemert on June 12, 1999.
