= Child Genius (American TV series) =

2015 American reality TV series

- Genre: Reality competition
- Presented by: Leland Melvin
- Narrated by: Mocean Melvin
- Country of origin: United States
- Original language: English
- No. of seasons: 2
- No. of episodes: 20

Production
- Executive producers: Eric Pierce; Robert A. Palmer; Mary Donahue; Laurie Girion; Pamela Healey; John Hesling; David Hillman; Eli Lehrer; Dan Snook
- Running time: 40 to 43 minutes
- Production companies: A&E Networks; Shed Media

Original release
- Network: Lifetime
- Release: January 6, 2015 – February 25, 2016

Child Genius is an American reality competition series produced by Shed Media (now Warner Bros. Television UK) along with A&E Networks in cooperation, with American Mensa. It is based on a UK program by the same name.

The show features 20 children between the ages of 8 and 12 from across the country, all competing for a $100,000 college fund and the title of Child Genius 2014. Each week the remaining competitors go head in to head in various mental challenges testing their knowledge of: Math, Spelling, Geography, Memory, the Human Body, U.S. Presidents, Vocabulary, Current Events, Zoology, Astronomy and Space, Inventions, Literature and the Arts, Earth Science and Logic. The competition is moderated by former NASA astronaut Leland D. Melvin, with additional judging provided by North American MENSA representative, Matt Stern, and Jeopardy! champion, Pam Mueller. Challenges took place at the Skirball Cultural Center in Los Angeles, California.

The series premiered on January 6, 2015, on Lifetime.

The second season retitled as Child Genius: Battle of the Brightest premiered on January 7, 2016. This season's cast only consisted of 12 geniuses between the ages of 9 and 12. Additionally, Lisa Van Gemert (who was featured during Season 1 for asides) became the new representative for American MENSA, and Dr. Timothy Gunn replaced Pam Mueller as question validator.

== Season 1 ==
=== The Geniuses ===
Name	Hometown	Age	IQ	Interests
Adi	Manhattan Beach, California	12		Reading, Writing, Astrology
Alexa	Scottsdale, Arizona	12	157	Mathematics, Coding
Binyamin	Orange County, California	12	Top 0.1%	Science, Mathematics, Robotics
Christopher	LA, California	9		Chemistry, Writing
Eden	Washington D.C.	8		Literature, History
Graham	Verdigris, Oklahoma	10	Top 0.1%	Geography, Hurricanes
Izzy	Richmond, Virginia	8	146	Foreign Languages, Mathematics
Jason	Furlong, Pennsylvania	10	Top 0.1%	Mathematics
Jaxon	Mckinney, Texas	12	148	Geology, Mathematics
John	Myrtle Beach, South Carolina	9	Top 1%	Science
Katherine	Rancho Palos Verdes, California	12	140	Music, Anatomy, Literature, Dance
Katie	Chatsworth, California	9	146	Science, Music, Drama, Designing
Kellan	Redondo Beach, California	12	150	Architecture
Liam	Redondo Beach, California	10	142	Art, Spelling
Madison	Studio City, California	8	158(highest known IQ in this competition (not including the other IQs that were not specifically given.)	Poetry, Chess, Human Antatomy
Robbie	LA, California	10		Medicine, Science
Ryan	Charlotte, North Carolina	12	156	Mathematics, Music
Tanishq	Sacramento, California	10	Top 0.1%	Science, Mathematics, Literature
Vanya	Olathe, Kansas	12	144	Spelling, Acting, Science, Medicine
Yeji	Rolling Hills Estates, California	12	144	Literature, Mathematics

=== Competitor Progress ===
Elimination Chart
Genius	Week 1			Week 2			Week 3			Week 4			Week 5			Week 6			Week 7			FINALS		
Genius	Math	Geo	Total	Human Anatomy	Memory	Total	Vocabulary	Astronomy	Total	Zoology	Spelling	Total	US Presidents	Logic	Total	Current Events	Earth Sciences	Total	Inventions	Literature & the Arts	Total	Olympiad		Result
Vanya	5	9	14	8	42	50	10	7	17	5	10	15	7	9	16	12	7	19	11	12	23	14	30	WINNER
Yeji	?	?	?	6	?	?	?	?	?	6	10	16	9	12	21	10	12	22	9	12	21	13	24	Runner - Up
Graham	3	9	12	5	32	37	10	8	18	9	8	17*	11	8	19	9	9	18	9	7	16	9	18	Third Place
Katherine	7	5	12	10	52	62	8	8	16*	9	8	17*	8	10	18	10	15	25	12	8	20	7		
Ryan	11	7	18	8	40	48	9	5	14	5	9	14	8	14	22	12	7	19	5	7	12			
Binyamin	4	7	11	?	?	?	4	8	12	6	5	11	7	8	15	7	5	12						
Tanishq	4	6	10	10	52	62	10	6	16*	9	8	17*	6	9	15									
Jason	6	9	15	6	?	?	?	?	?	5	8	13	2	8	10									
Kellan	6	8	14	4	?	?	?	?	?	5	1	6												
Katie	7	6	13	6	?	?	?	?	?	1	7	8												
Adi	8	7	15	?	8	?	?	?	?															
Alexa	9	4	13	1	22	23	1	2	3															
Jaxon	10	6	16	4	10	14																		
Robbie	6	7	13	4	13	17																		
Madison	4	5	9	1	0	1																		
Izzy	3	5	8																					
John	2	4	6																					
Christopher	4	5	9																					
Eden	2	3	5																					
Liam	1	4	5																					

Results
Limegreen background means the genius won the competition.
Blue background means the genius made it to the final round of the competition but did not win.
Gold background means the genius received the highest composite score in that week's competitions.
Silver background means the genius received the second highest composite score in that week's competitions
Bronze background means the genius received the third highest composite score in that week's competitions
Red background means the genius received one of the lowest composite scores and was eliminated from the competition.

=== Episodes ===
No. overall	No. in season	Title	Original release date	U.S. viewers (millions)
1	1	"I Am Not A Tiger Mommy"	January 6, 2015	0.41
ROUND 1: Mathematics Each competitor was given two minutes to answer as many mathematics question as they could. Question consisted of adding and multiplying a series of number together (i.e. 526 + 216 + 345). For the first minute competitors were allowed to use a pencil and paper to solve, but for the second minute they could only use their minds. ROUND 2: Geography Competitors were given 90 seconds to answer as many geography related questions as possible.: High Scores: First Place: Ryan - 18 (11 Math, 7 Geography); Second Place: Jaxon - 16 (10 Math, 6 Geography); Third Place: Vanya - 14 (5 Math, 9 Geography); Eliminated: Izzy - 8 (3 Math, 5 Geography); John - 6 (2 Math, 4 Geography); Christopher - ? (? Math, 5 Geography); Eden - 5 (2 Math, 3 Geography); Liam - 5 (1 Math, 4 Geography)
2	2	"Please Drink Some Water"	January 13, 2015	0.26
ROUND 1: Human Anatomy The remaining 15 competitors were given 10 Human Anatomy questions. ROUND 2: Memory Each competitor was given a full deck of playing cards in a different order. With only one hour to memorize, the competitors had to recite the order of their cards. Once they got one wrong, or could not remember any more cards they were out.: High Scores: First Place: Katherine - 62 (10 Anatomy, 52 Cards)/Tanish - 62 (10 Anatomy, 52 Cards); Third Place: Vanya - 50 (8 Anatomy, 44 Cards); Eliminated: Jaxon - 14 (4 Anatomy, 10 Memory); Robbie - 17 (4 Anatomy, 13 Memory); Madison - 1 (1 Anatomy, 0 Memory)
3	3	"Focus, Focus, Focus!"	January 20, 2015	0.30
ROUND 1: Vocabulary The remaining 12 geniuses were given 3 minutes to answer up to ten questions about Vocabulary. ROUND 2: Astronomy Competitors were given 90 seconds to answer up to 10 questions about Astronomy.: High Scores: First Place: Graham - 18 (10 Vocabulary, 8 Astronomy); Second Place: Vanya - 17 (10 Vocabulary, 7 Astronomy); Third Place: Katherine - 16 (8 Vocabulary, 8 Astronomy)***Tanishq also received a 16 Composite Score, However, per the rules, a tiebreaker goes to the competitor with the more even spread of scores, which goes to Katherine.; Eliminated: Adi - ? (? Vocabulary, ? Astronomy); Alexa - 3 (1 Vocabulary, 2 Astronomy)
4	4	"Triskaidekaphobia"	January 27, 2015	n/a
ROUND 1: Zoology Competitors were given 90 seconds to answers up to 10 questions about Zoology, such as classification, identification, and anatomy. ROUND 2: Spelling Competitors were given 10 words to spell.: High Scores: First Place: Graham - 17 (9 Zoology, 8 Spelling)**Second Place: Tanishq - 17 (9 Zoology, 8 Spelling)**Third Place: Katherine - 17 (9 Zoology, 8 Spelling)***Graham, Tanishq, and Katherine all received the same composite score, as well as the same spread. This led to a secondary tiebreaker which gave the win to whoever had the most correct answers in a row.; Eliminated: Katie - 8 (1 Zoology, 7 Spelling); Kellan - 6 (5 Zoology, 1 Spelling)
5	5	"You Signed Up For This"	February 3, 2015	n/a
ROUND 1: U.S. Presidents Each competitor was given 2 minutes to answer up to 15 questions about the U.S. Presidents ROUND 2: Logic Competitors were given 5 minutes to solve up to 15 logic problems.: High Scores: First Place: Ryan - 22 (8 U.S. Presidents, 14 Logic); Second Place: Yeji - 21 (9 U.S. Presidents, 12 Logic); Third Place: Graham - 19 (11 U.S. Presidents, 8 Logic); Eliminated: Tanishq - 15 (6 U.S. Presidents, 9 Logic); Jason - 10 (2 U.S. Presidents, 8 Logic)
6	6	"These Kids Are Like Cheetahs"	February 10, 2015	n/a
ROUND 1: Current Events The remaining 6 competitors were each given 2 and a half minutes to answer up to 15 questions relating to current world and historical events. ROUND 2: Earth Sciences Each genius has 2 2 and a half minutes to answer up to 15 questions relating to Earth Sciences (including Biology and Geology): High Scores: Katherine - 25 (10 Current Events, 15 Earth Sciences); Eliminated: Binyamin - 12 (7 Current Events, 5 Earth Sciences); As of this episode there was only one top scorer named, and one competitor eliminated
7	7	"You Need To Stop Lying To Yourself"	February 17, 2015	0.34
ROUND 1: Inventions The remaining 5 geniuses will have 2 and a half minutes to answer up to 15 questions about technology, inventions, and inventors that have changed society. ROUND 2: Literature & Arts Competitors are given 2 and a half minutes to answer up to 15 questions about literature, drama, and art.: High Scores: Vanya - 23 (11 Inventions, 12 Literature & Arts); Eliminated: Ryan - 12 (5 Inventions, 7 Literature & Arts)
8	8	"We All Want to Win, Right?"	February 24, 2015	n/a
ROUND 1: Sudden Death The Final Four Competitors each received 5 minutes to answer up to 25 questions ranging from all 14 topics. The finalist with the lowest score after the round would be eliminated.: Eliminated: Katherine - 7/25; ROUND 2: Academic Olympiad The remaining 3 geniuses were given 10 minutes to answer up to 50 questions from all 14 subjects covered throughout the competition. The competitor with the most correct answers would be named Child Genius 2015: 2nd Runner-Up: Graham - 18/50 $5,000 Academic Scholarship; Runner-Up: Yeji 24/50 $10,000 Academic Scholarship; CHILD GENIUS 2015: Vanya Shivashankar 30/50 $100,000 Academic Scholarship

== Season 2 ==
=== The Geniuses ===
Name	Hometown	Age	IQ	Interests
Adrian	Peachtree City, Georgia	11	Top 0.1%	Music, Science
Arnav	Dobbs Ferry, New York	10	145	Mathematics, Literature
Chancellor	Stuart, Florida	11	Top 0.1%	Computers
Claire	Arcadia, California	11	Top 0.1%	Mathematics, Science, History
Drake	Los Altos Hills, California	11	155	Mathematics, Science
Gianna	Denver, Colorado	11	145	Mathematics, Science, Anatomy
Iris	San Antonio, Texas	12	144	Writing, Music, Shakespeare, Acting
Jaden	Chico, California	12	Top 0.1%	Mathematics, Music, Cooking
Jenna	San Antonio, Texas	12	162	Literature, Genetics
Sam	Sugar Land, Texas	12	152	Mathematics, Science, Languages, Astronomy
Selah	Kissimmee, Florida	10	143	Science, Geology, Human Anatomy, chemistry
Vivek	Bloomington, Illinois	10	150+	Astrophysics, Science

=== Competitor Progress ===
Elimination Chart
	Week 1			Week 2			Week 3			Week 4			Week 5			Week 6			Week 7			Week 8			Week 9			FINALS		
	Math	Memory	Total	Spelling	Geo	Total	US History	Logic	Total	Current Events	Human Body	Total	Literature Fine Arts	Vocabulary	Total	Advanced Math	Speed Memory	Total	Advanced Spelling	World Landmark	Total	Advanced Logic	World History	Total	Advanced Science	Specialty Subject	Total	Olympiad		Result
Adrian	5	34	39	10	7	17	7	8	15	10	9	19	10	10	20	10	6	16	5	10	15	10	10	20	10	9	19	12:9	30	WINNER
Arnav	9	24	33	9	8	17	9	9	18	9	9	18	10	10	20	10	8	18	5	10	15	9	9	18	9	9	18	16	26	Runner-Up
Claire	6	40	46	10	10	20	5	10	15	9	8	17	10	10	20	10	7	17	6	9	15	4	8	12	8	10	18	12:6		
Sam	10	31	41	7	5	13	4	10	14	7	8	15	8	10	18	10	7	17	9	9	18	7	9	16	8	9	17			
Vivek	4	18	22	8	9	17	6	9	15	9	9	18	10	10	20	10	6	16	6	10	16	6	5	11						
Chancellor	7	52	59	8	4	12	2	9	11	8	9	17	8	7	15	10	7	17	7	5	12									
Jaden	7	31	38	8	6	14	3	9	12	10	9	19	10	8	18	9	5	14												
Iris	4	11	15	10	1	11	5	5	10	9	9	18	7	7	14															
Gianna	10	17	27	1	4	5	4	10	14	6	7	13																		
Selah	2	7	9	5	1	6	2	6	8																					
Drake	2	16	18	0	1	1																								
Jenna	3	n/a	n/a	E																										

Results
Limegreen background means the genius won the competition.
Blue background means the genius made it to the final round of the competition but did not win.
Gold background means the genius received the highest composite score in that week's competitions.
Silver background means the genius received the second highest composite score in that week's competitions
Bronze background means the genius received the third highest composite score in that week's competitions
Red background means the genius received one of the lowest composite scores and was eliminated from the competition.

=== Episodes ===
No. overall	No. in season	Title	Original release date	U.S. viewers (millions)
9	1	"I'm the Fun Parent"	January 7, 2016	0.19
It's the first week of the Child Genius competition, and twelve 9–12 year old Child Geniuses, with high achieving, driven parents in tow, prepare to battle it out in this week's rounds--math and memory--all hoping to win a one hundred thousand dollar college fund prize and the title of "Child Genius." ROUND 1: Mathematics Each competitor has 2 and a half minutes to answer up to 10 mathematics questions (including simple operations and percentages). Players were allowed to use pencil and paper for the first minute, but not the remaining minute and a half. ROUND 2: Memory Each competitor was given a full deck of playing cards in a different order. With only one hour to memorize, the competitors had to recite the order of their cards. Once they got one wrong, or could not remember any more cards they were out.: High Scores: First Place: Chancellor (59); Second Place: Claire/Arnav (28); Eliminated: Jenna - n/a; Jenna forfeited the Memory round due to a meltdown and chose not to participate in the ceremony, therefore quitting the competition.
10	2	"Silicon Valley is All About Taking Risks"	January 14, 2016	TBD
ROUND 1: Spelling Each competitor is given 10 words to spell. ROUND 2: Geography Each competitor has to answer up to 10 geography related questions.: High Scores: First Place: Claire - 20; Second Place: Arnav/Adrian/Vivek - 17; Eliminated: Drake - 1
11	3	"My Husband is Becoming a Tiger Dad"	January 21, 2016	TBD
ROUND 1: U.S. History Each competitor has to answer up to 10 questions relating to the history of the United States. ROUND 2: Logic Each competitor were given to solve 10 logic problems.: High Scores: First Place: Arnav - 18; Second Place: Adrian/Claire/Vivek - 15; Eliminated: Selah - 8
12	4	"Pull Yourself Together"	January 28, 2016	TBD
ROUND 1: Current Events ROUND 2: Human Body: High Scores: First Place: Adrian/Jaden - 19; Second Place: Arnav/Iris/Vivek - 18; Eliminated: Gianna
13	5	"Good Is Not Gonna Cut It"	February 4, 2016	TBD
ROUND 1: Literature and Fine Arts Each competitor are given to answer 10 questions based on arts, literature, and drama. ROUND 2: Vocabulary Competitors are given 10 vocabulary questions.: High Scores: First Place: Adrian/Arnav/Claire/Vivek - 20; Second Place: Sam/Jaden - 18; Eliminated: Iris - 14
14	6	"This Is an Outrage!"	February 11, 2016	TBD
ROUND 1: Advanced Math Each competitor is given 10 math problems to solve but at a higher level of complexity. ROUND 2: Speed Memory: High Scores: First Place: Arnav - 18; Second Place: Claire/Chancellor/Sam - 17; Eliminated: Jaden - 14
15	7	"I Really Seriously Really Wanna Win"	February 18, 2016	TBD
ROUND 1: Advanced Spelling Each competitor are given ten college-level words to spell to which they spell forwards, backwards, and they will have to unscramble the word on the monitor and spell them. ROUND 2: World Landmarks: High Scores: First Place: Sam - 18; Second Place: Vivek - 16; Eliminated: Chancellor - 12
16	8	"Mom, You're Confusing Me!"	February 25, 2016	TBD
ROUND 1: Advanced Logic ROUND 2: World History: High Scores: First Place: Adrian - 20; Second Place: Arnav - 18; Eliminated: Vivek - 11
17	9	"You'll Be First or Last"	March 3, 2016	TBD
ROUND 1: Advanced Science ROUND 2: Specialty Subject Each competitor chose a topic that they knew well.: High Scores: First Place: Adrian - 19; Second Place: Arnav/Claire - 18; Eliminated: Sam - 17
