= El Camino High School (Oceanside, California) =

Public high school in Oceanside, California

Coordinates: 33°13′7.1″N 117°19′2.3″W

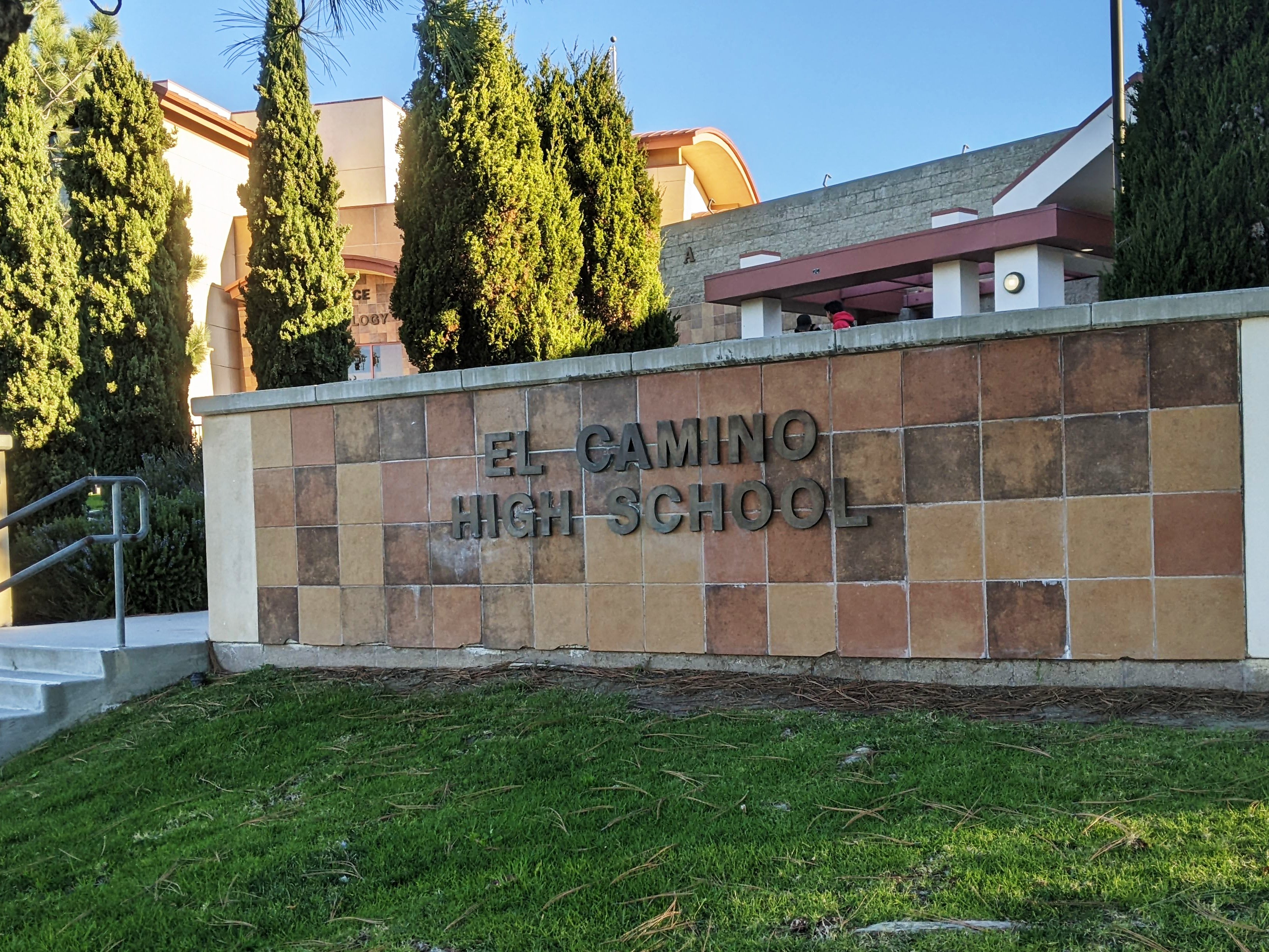

Location
- 400 Rancho Del Oro Drive; Oceanside, California; United States

Information
- Type: Public
- Established: 1975
- School district: Oceanside Unified School District
- Principal: Eileen Frazier
- Teaching staff: 106.48 (FTE)
- Enrollment: 2,526 (2023–2024)
- Student to teacher ratio: 23.72
- Colors: Brown and gold
- Athletics: CIF San Diego Section, Avocado West League
- Mascot: Wildcat
- Rival: Oceanside High School
- Newspaper: the sun
- Website: echs.oside.us

El Camino High School is one of two high schools of the Oceanside Unified School District, located at 400 Rancho Del Oro Drive in Oceanside, California. Declared a California Distinguished School in the early 2000s, it was originally named "Oceanside High School East", and officially became El Camino High School in 1976. El Camino's Truax Theatre was built in the early 1980s and houses a large performance venue, an adjacent classroom with stage and large music and drama rooms. It also recently built a new Science and Technology Building and is undergoing constant construction to clean up the campus. The ECHS mascot is the "Wildcat" and the school colors are brown and gold.

== Notable alumni ==
- Diego Barbosa, New York Times best-selling author
- Chris Brooks, NFL running back, Green Bay Packers
- Richard Crawford, former NFL player
- Toniu Fonoti, former NFL player, he transferred after his sophomore season
- Michael Lewis Foster, American filmmaker
- Mike Kracalik, former NFL player
- Cory Ohnesorge, former football player
- Jordan Paopao, American former offensive lineman and special teams coordinator and tight ends coach for the Washington Huskies
- J. C. Pearson, former NFL player
- Gyno Pomare, former professional basketball player
- Noel Prefontaine, former CFL player
- Denise Richards, American actress, former fashion model, animal welfare advocate and philanthropist
- Nelson Rosario, former football player
- Antwain Spann, former NFL player
- Ernest Spears, former NFL player
- Greg Sprink, former collegiate basketball player
- Ken Stills, former NFL player
- Nuuausala Tuilefano, track and field athlete (shot put)
- Toussaint Tyler, former NFL player
- Lisa Van Gemert, American educationalist and author
- Bryant Westbrook, former NFL player
- Rich Wilkes, screenwriter Airheads, xXx, The Dirt
- Dokie Williams, former NFL player

== Image gallery ==
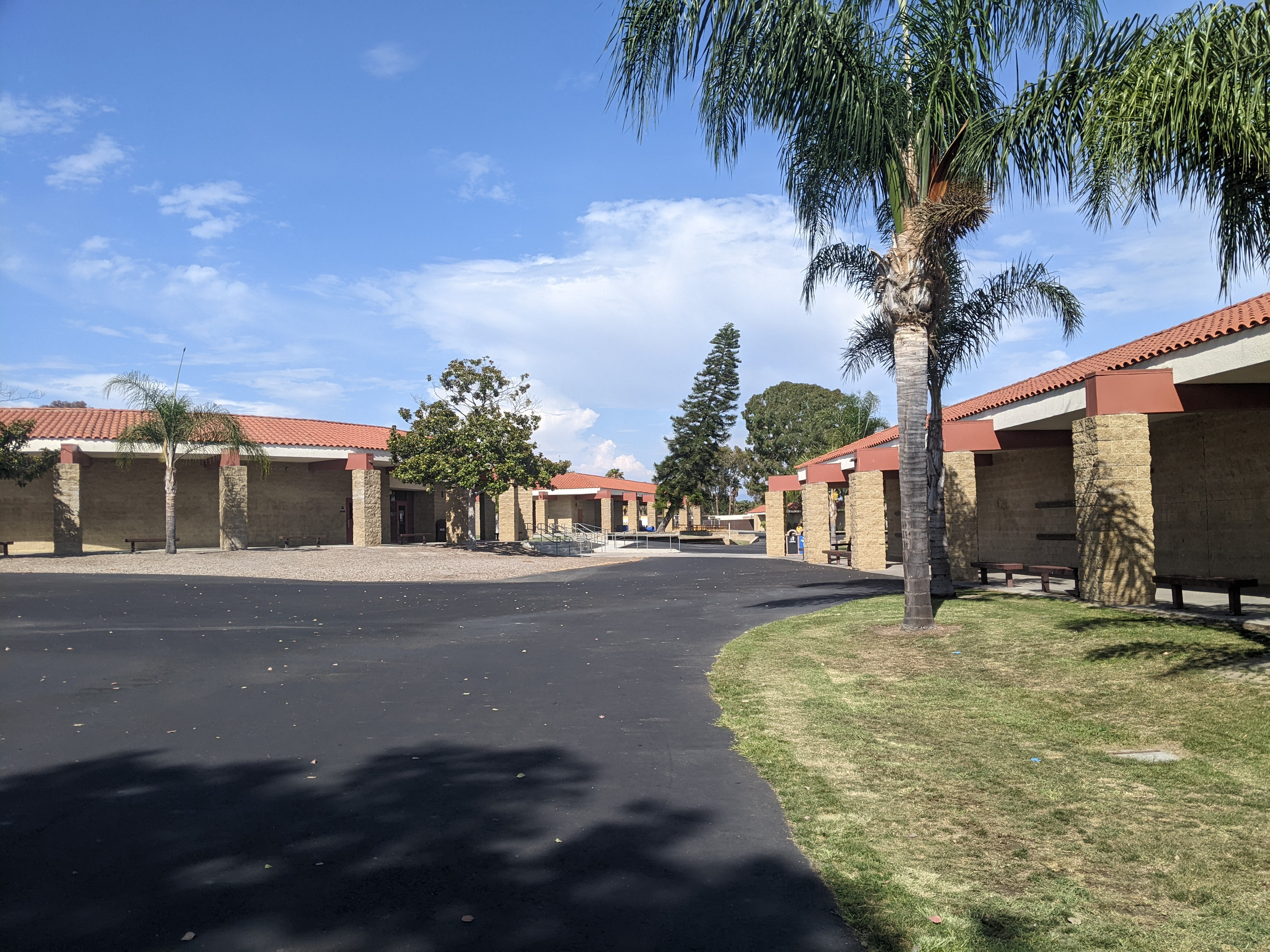
Campus

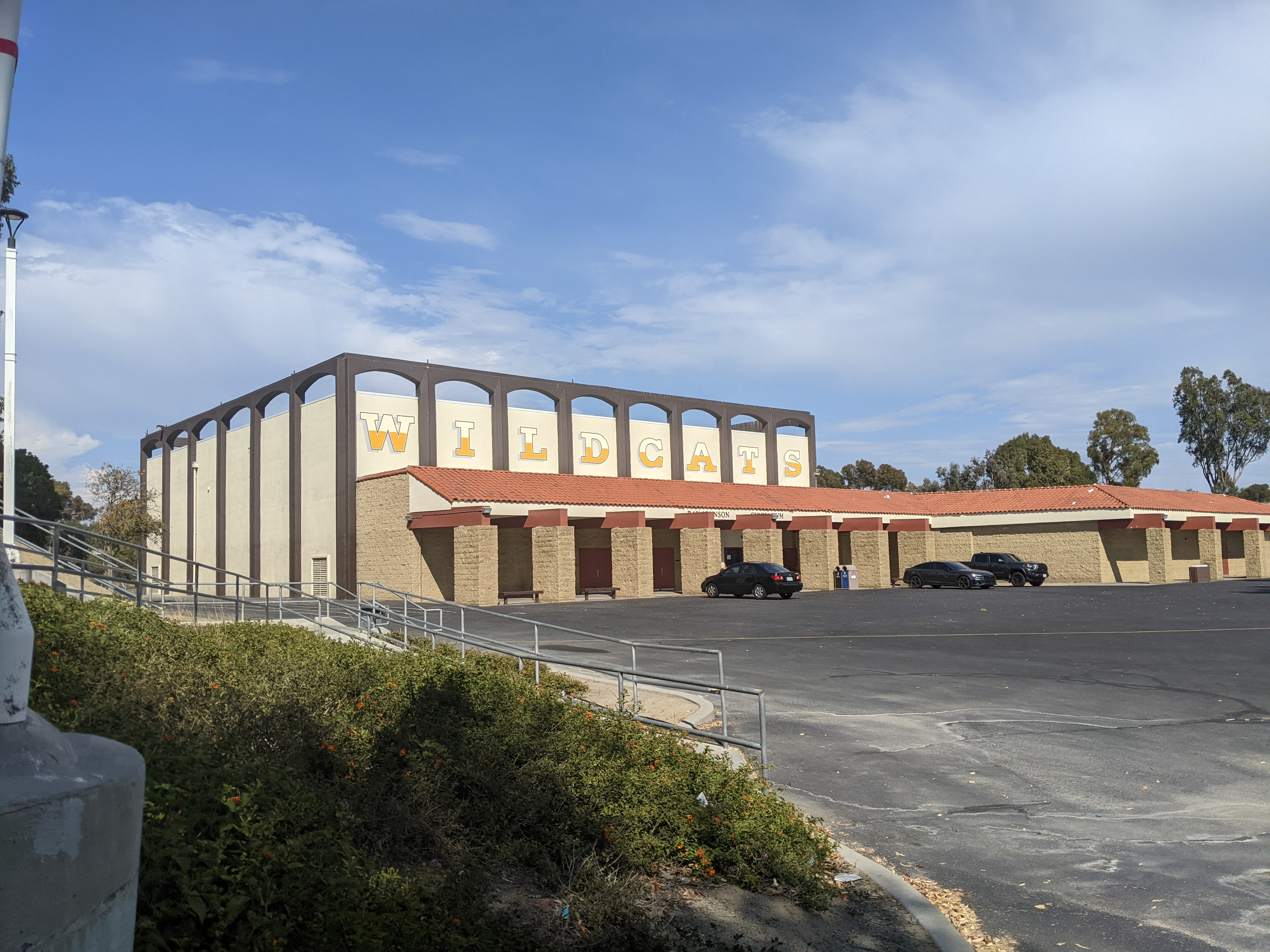
Gymnasium

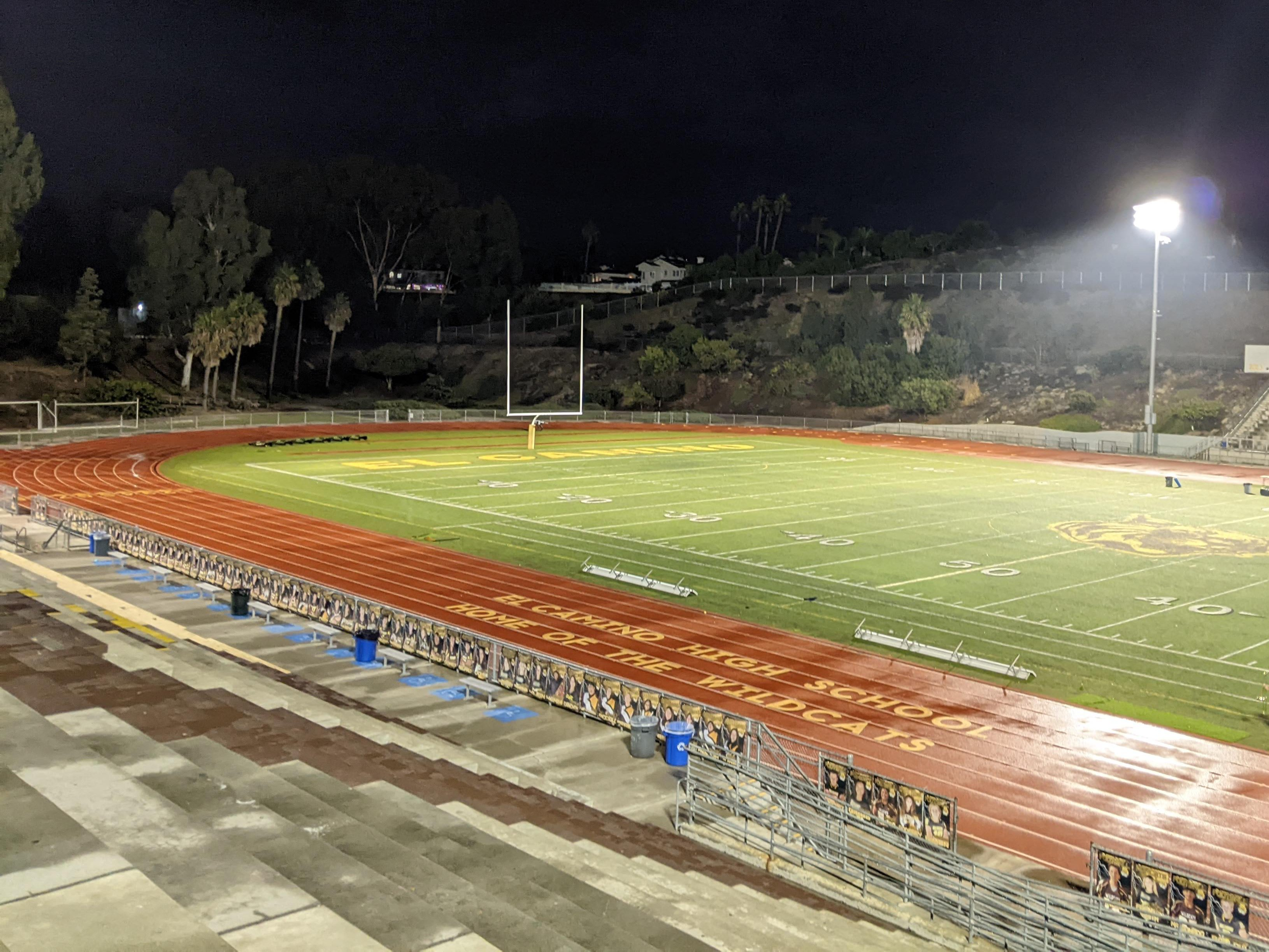
Football Stadium

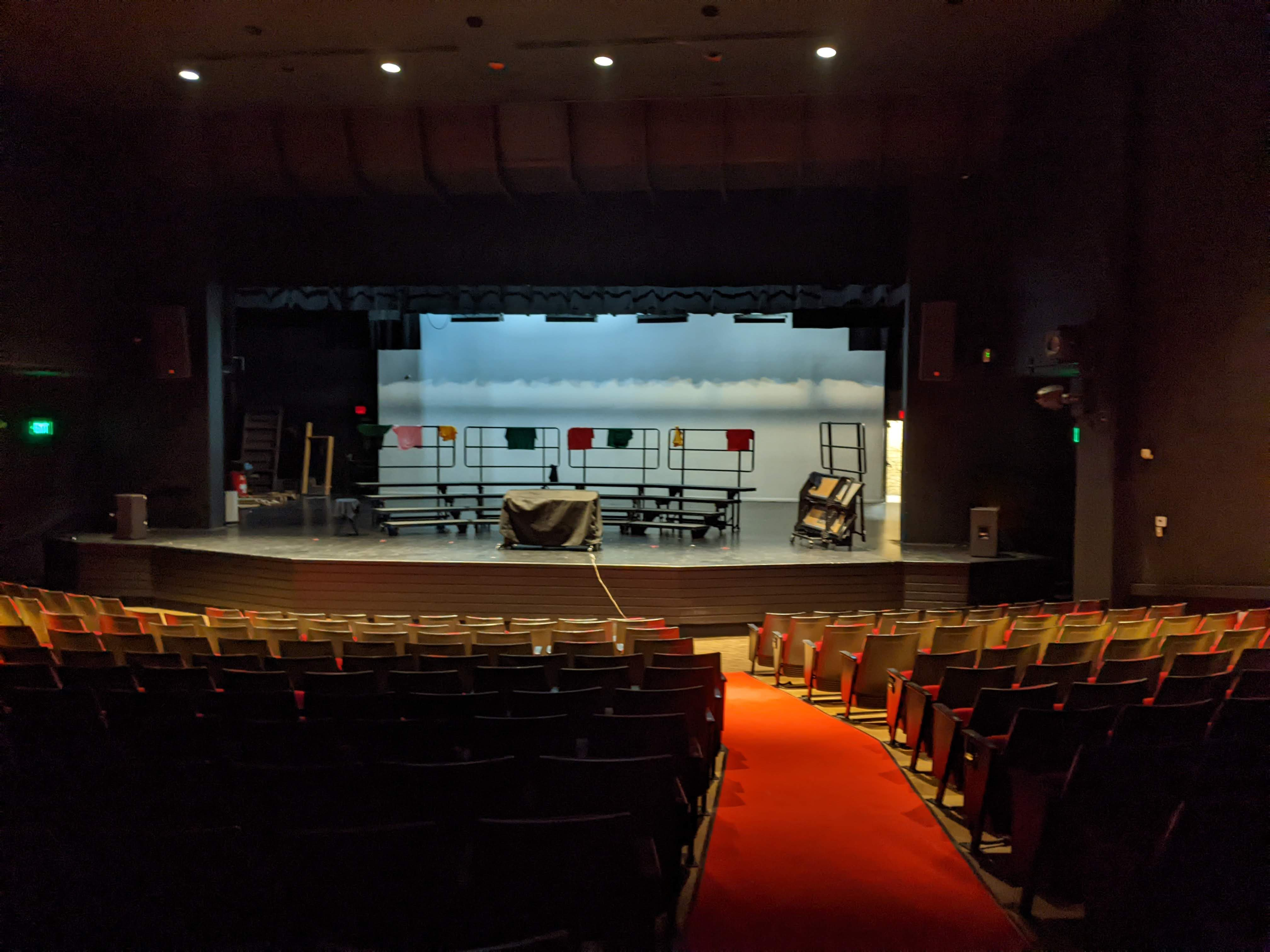
Truax Theatre
