= Ernest Spears =

American football player (born 1967)

No. 33
- Position: Defensive back

Personal information
- Born: November 6, 1967 (age 59); Oceanside, California, U.S.
- Listed height: 5 ft 11 in (1.80 m)
- Listed weight: 192 lb (87 kg)

Career information
- High school: El Camino (Oceanside)
- College: USC
- NFL draft: 1990: 10th round, 267th overall pick

Career history
- New Orleans Saints (1990); (1991)*; (1992)*
- * Offseason or practice squad member only
- Stats at Pro Football Reference

Ernest Spears (born November 6, 1967) is an American former professional football defensive back. He played for the New Orleans Saints in 1990. He was selected by the Saints in the tenth round of the 1990 NFL draft.
