= Leland D. Melvin =

American engineer and former astronaut (born 1964)

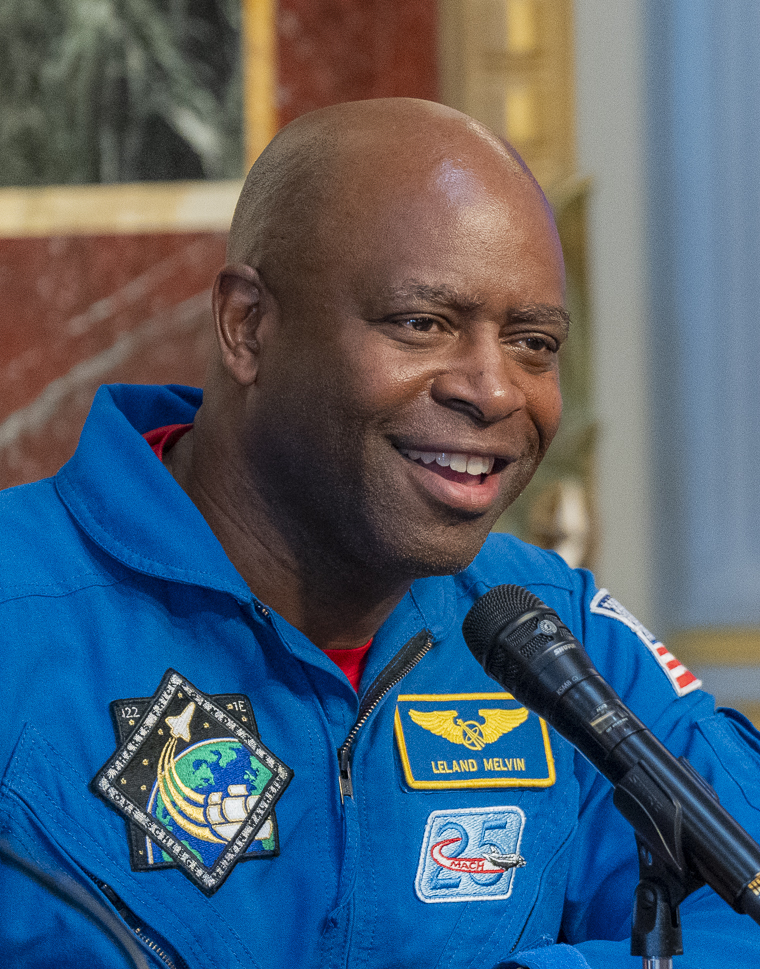
- Melvin in 2024
- Born: Leland Devon Melvin; February 15, 1964 (age 62); Lynchburg, Virginia, U.S.
- Education: University of Richmond (BS); University of Virginia (MS)
- Space career

NASA astronaut
- Time in space: 23d 13h 28m
- Selection: NASA Group 17 (1998)
- Missions: STS-122; STS-129
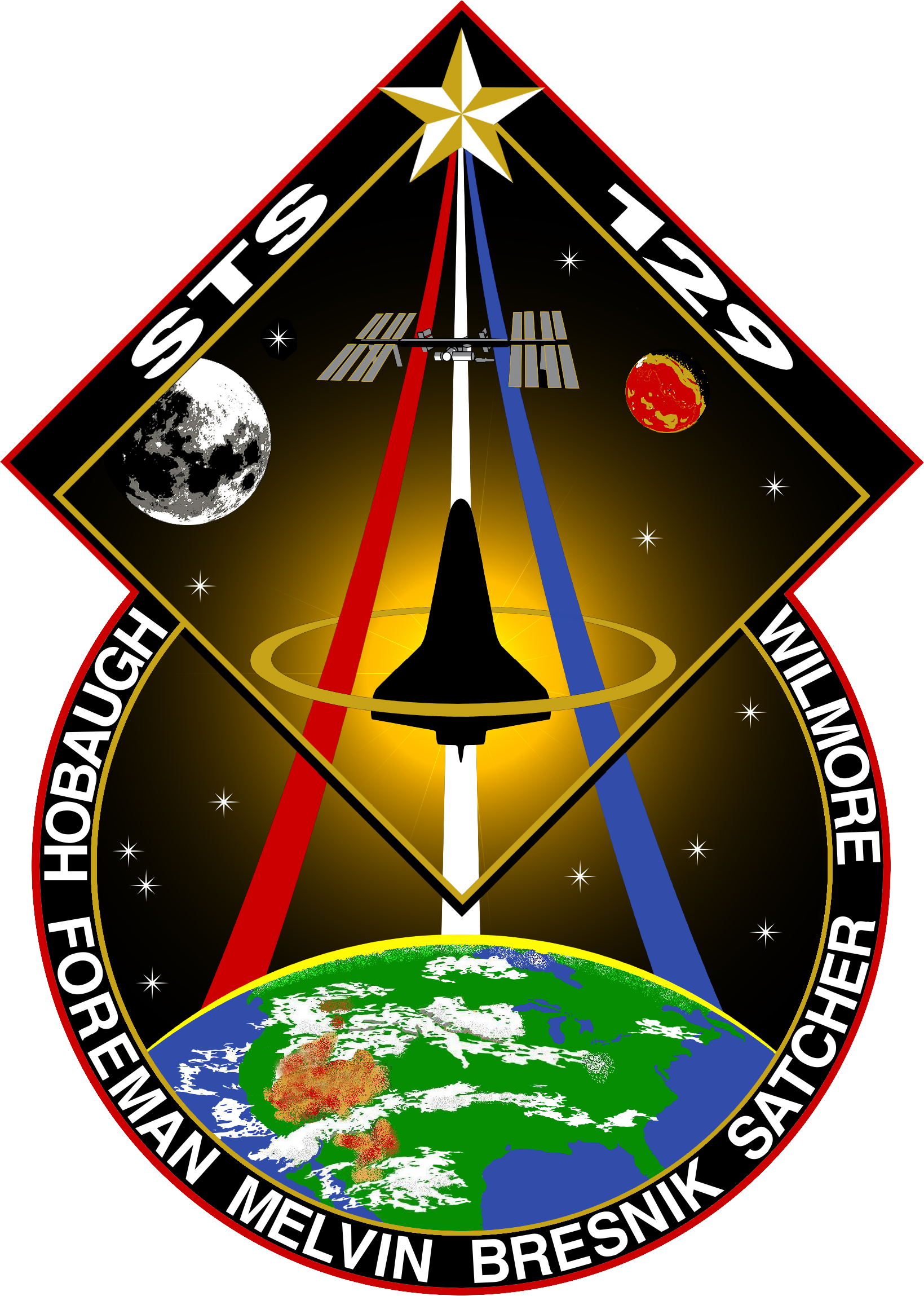
- Mission insignia
- Football career

No. 4 – Richmond Spiders
- Position: Wide receiver

Career information
- High school: Heritage (Lynchburg, VA): University of Richmond (1982–1985)

Awards and highlights
- University of Richmond Athletic Hall of Fame (1996–1997); All-UR Stadium Team (2010)
- Website: Official website

Leland Devon Melvin (born February 15, 1964) is an American engineer and a retired NASA astronaut. He served on board the Space Shuttle Atlantis as a mission specialist on STS-122, and as mission specialist 1 on STS-129. Melvin was named the NASA Associate Administrator for Education in October 2010. Prior to joining NASA, he was a professional football player.

== Biography ==
Born on February 15, 1964, in Lynchburg, Virginia, Melvin attended Heritage High School and then went on to the University of Richmond on a football scholarship, where he received a bachelor's degree in chemistry. In 1989, he received a Master of Science degree in Materials Science Engineering from the University of Virginia.

His parents, Deems and Grace, reside in Lynchburg, Virginia. Melvin's recreational interests include photography, piano, reading, music, cycling, tennis, and snowboarding.

Melvin has since been the host of Child Genius and a guest judge in Top Chef, as well as appearing with his dogs in the seventh season of The Dog Whisperer and the second season of the Netflix series Dogs.

== Football career ==
Melvin was a wide receiver on the University of Richmond football team from 1982 to 1985. Melvin is first on the University of Richmond's career lists with 198 receptions for 2,669 yards, and fourth on Richmond's career touchdown receptions list with 16. He was an AP honorable mention All-America selection in 1984 and 1985 and second-team Apple Academic All-America in 1985.

A team captain during his senior season, Melvin had his best year in 1985, with 65 catches for 956 yards and eight touchdowns. His top game was in 1984 against James Madison University, when he had 10 catches for 208 yards and one touchdown.

Melvin caught at least one pass in every game he played as a Richmond Spider (39).

He was in the University of Richmond Athletic Hall of Fame Inductee Class of 1996–97 and selected for the All-UR Stadium Team in 2009, which commemorates the greatest Spiders to have played at the stadium in its 81-year history.

Melvin was chosen by the Detroit Lions in the 11th round of the 1986 NFL draft as a wide receiver. During training camp, he pulled a hamstring and was released from the team in late August. In October, he was added to the Canadian Football League's Toronto Argonauts' practice roster.

He reported to the Dallas Cowboys the following spring but pulled a hamstring a second time, officially ending his hopes of a professional football career.

== NASA career ==
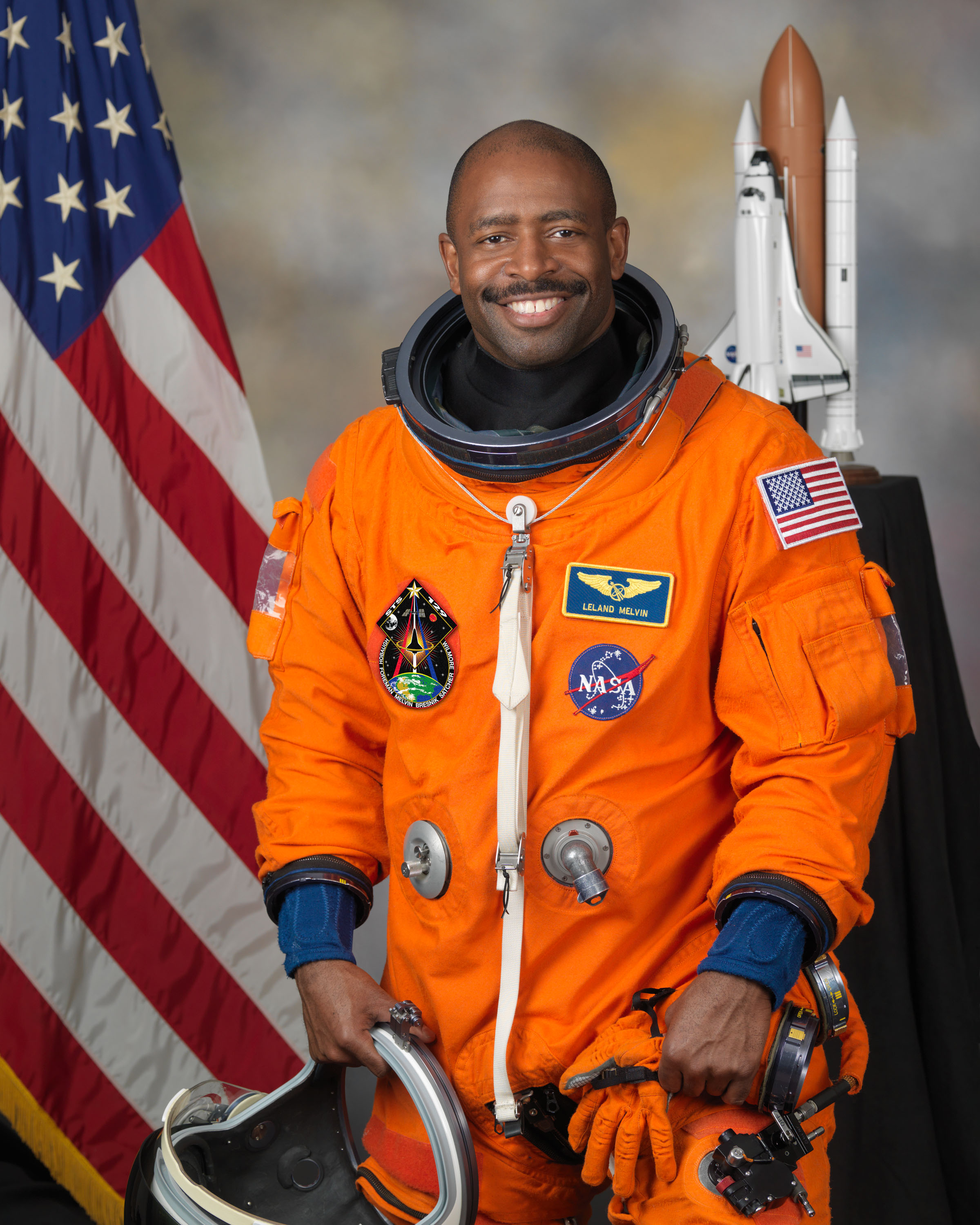
Leland Melvin in 2009

Melvin began working in the Nondestructive Evaluation Sciences Branch at NASA's Langley Research Center in 1989. His responsibilities included using optical fiber sensors to measure damage and deformation in composite and metallic structures. In 1994, he was selected to lead the Vehicle Health Monitoring team for the NASA/Lockheed Martin X-33 Reusable Launch Vehicle program. In 1996, he co-designed and monitored construction of an optical nondestructive evaluation facility capable of producing in-line fiber optic sensors.

Melvin was selected as an astronaut in June 1998. He was assigned to the Astronaut Office Space Station Operations Branch, and the Education Department at NASA Headquarters in Washington, D.C. As co-manager of NASA's Educator Astronaut Program, Melvin traveled across the United States, discussing space exploration with teachers and students, and promoting science, technology, engineering and mathematics. He next served in the Robotics Branch of the Astronaut Office. In October 2010, Melvin was appointed associate administrator for the Office of Education. In this role, Melvin was responsible for the development and implementation of NASA's education programs to inspire interest in science and technology, and raise public awareness about NASA goals and missions. He retired from NASA in February 2014.

Melvin flew two missions on the Space Shuttle Atlantis as a mission specialist on STS-122 and STS-129.

STS-122 (February 7 to 20, 2008) was the 24th shuttle mission to visit the International Space Station. Mission highlight was the delivery and installation of the European Space Agency's Columbus (ISS module). It took three spacewalks by crew members to prepare the Columbus Laboratory for its scientific work, and to replace an expended nitrogen tank on the Station's P-1 Truss. STS-122 was also a crew replacement mission, delivering Expedition-16 flight engineer, ESA astronaut Léopold Eyharts, and returning home with Expedition-16 flight engineer, NASA astronaut Daniel Tani. The STS-122 mission lasted 12 days, 18 hours, 21 minutes and 40 seconds, and traveled 5,296,832 statute miles in 203 Earth orbits.

STS-129 (November 16 to 29, 2009) was the 31st shuttle flight to the International Space Station. During the mission, the crew delivered two ExPRESS Logistics Carriers (ELC racks) to the International Space Station, about 30,000 pounds of replacement parts for systems that provide power to the station to keep it from overheating, and maintain proper orientation in space. The mission also featured three spacewalks. The STS-129 mission lasted 10 days, 19 hours, 16 minutes and 13 seconds, traveling 4.5 million miles in 171 orbits. STS-129 returned to Earth with them NASA Astronaut, Nicole Stott, following her tour of duty aboard the space station.

In all, Melvin logged over 565 hours in space.

== Personal life ==
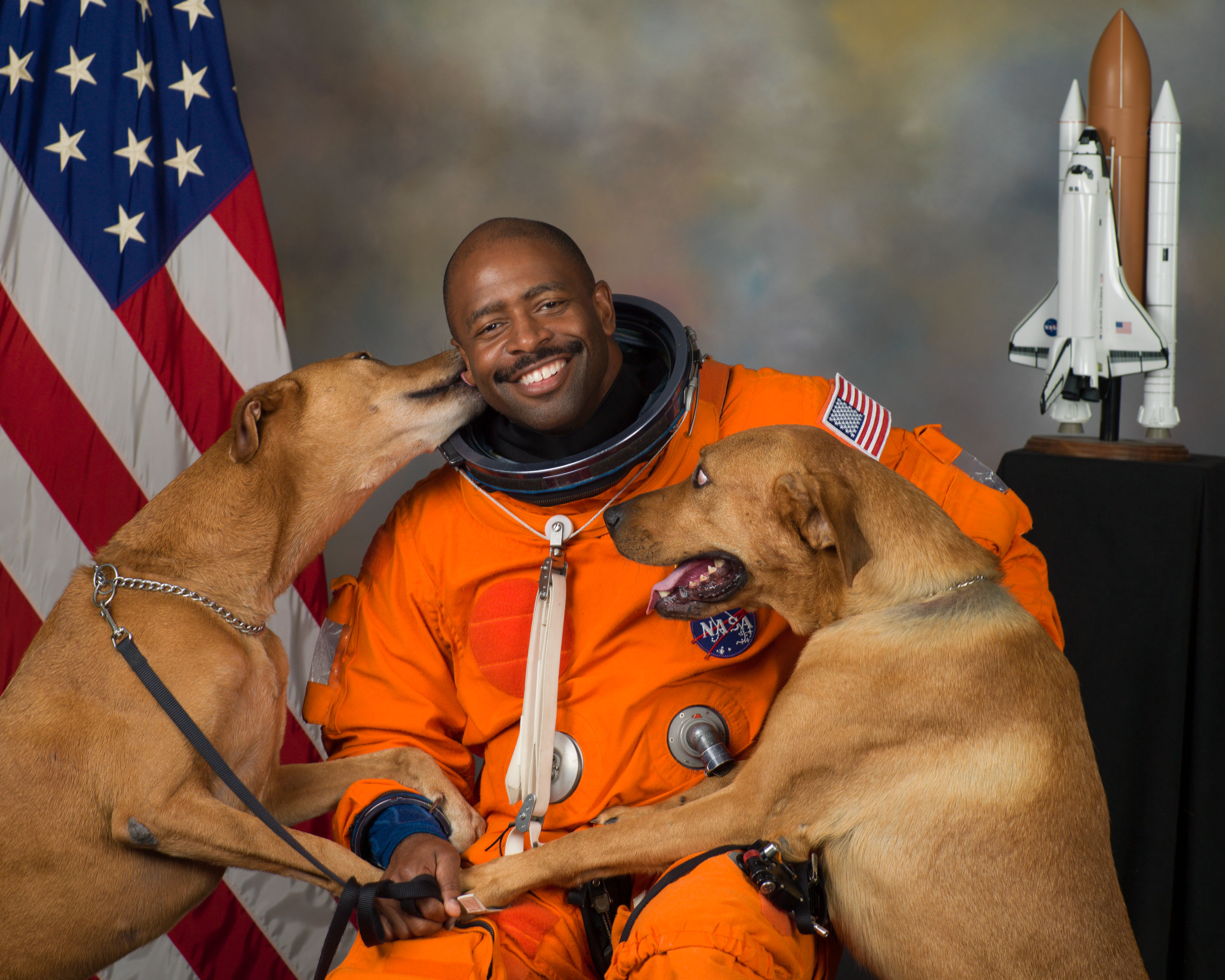
The viral photograph of Melvin with his dogs Jake and Scout

Since retiring from NASA, Leland has given several STEM lectures of his experience in space to a wide range of audiences, as well as his football career in the NFL. During his NASA career, while he was doing an underwater training, he sustained and partially recovered from a serious ear injury where his doctors stated the possibility of him being deaf, a malady which affects his left ear. Melvin has published two books; Chasing Space: An Astronaut's Story of Grit, Grace, and Second Chances and Chasing Space: Young Reader's Edition, both published in 2017.

In his spare time he enjoys playing the piano, cooking, and walking his two dogs. He is featured in several National Geographic documentaries and videos, including a 2010 episode of Dog Whisperer with Cesar Millan. In 2021, he featured in Season 2 of the Netflix television series Dogs, climbing Columbia Point with his Rhodesian Ridgebacks Roux and Zorro.

In 2015, a portrait of Melvin with his rescue dogs Jake and Scout went viral after being shared on Twitter. The photograph had been taken in 2009, when Melvin had snuck the dogs into the Johnson Space Center for his photoshoot. He recalled that, after bringing the dogs into the complex in his van and sneaking them into Studio 8 through a back entrance, he had urged photographer Robert Markowitz to quickly take photographs as the dogs gave him affection. This photograph was subsequently used on the cover of Melvin's autobiography, Chasing Space. Scout and Jake died in 2012 and 2013, respectively.

== Gallery ==
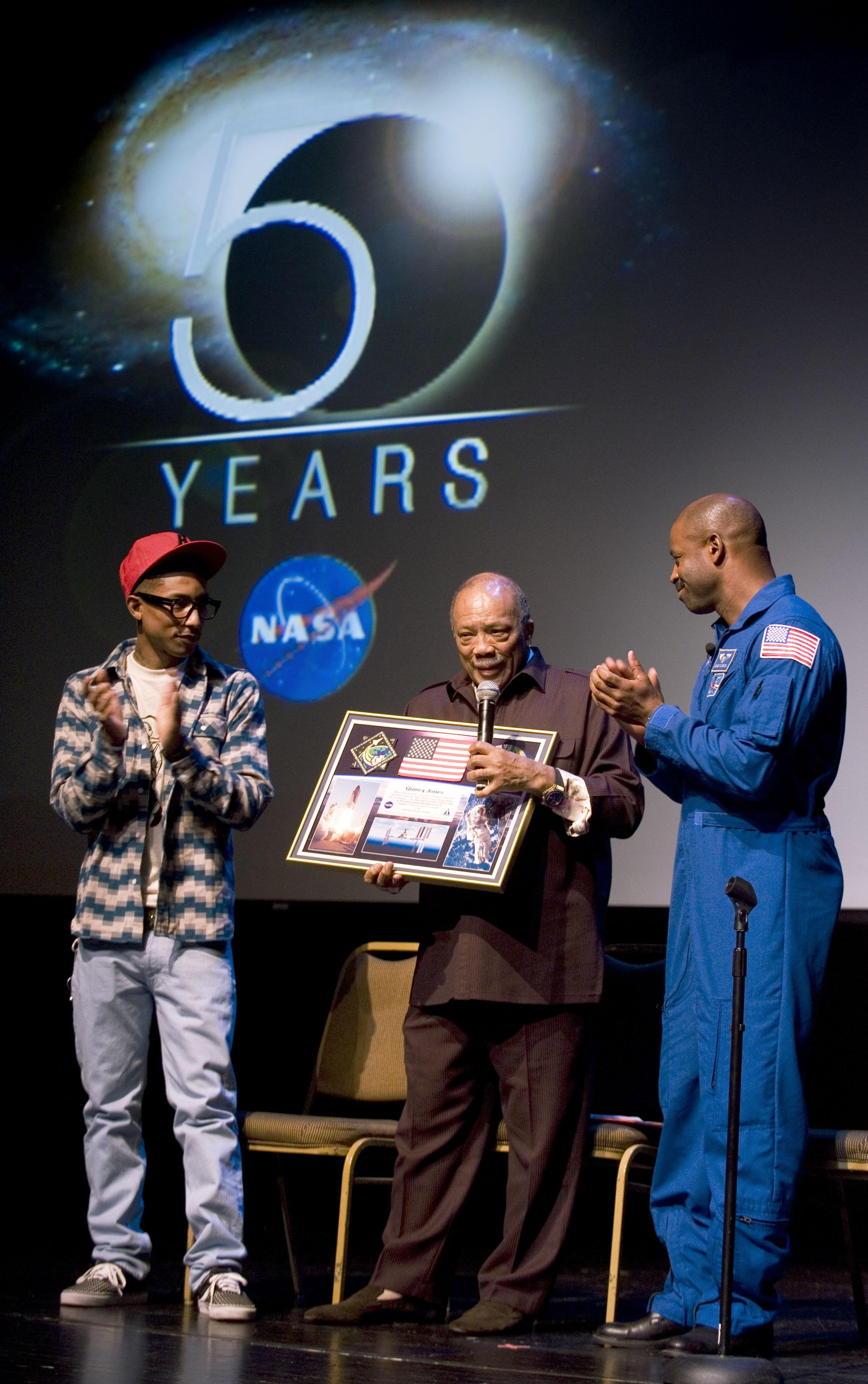
Leland Melvin and Pharrell Williams present a montage to Quincy Jones.

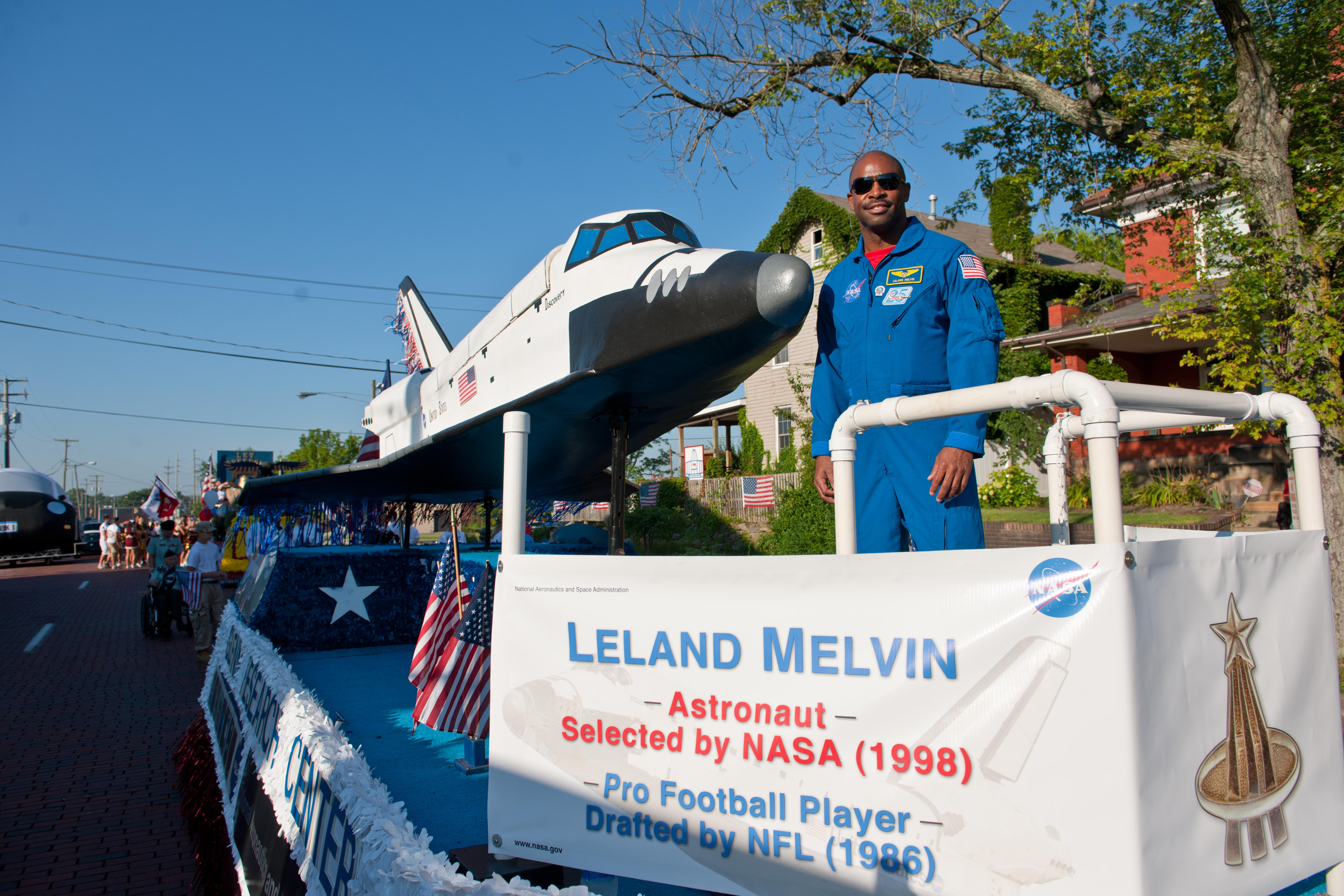
Melvin on the NASA Glenn Research Center float during the 2010 Pro Football Hall of Fame Festival Timken Grand Parade.

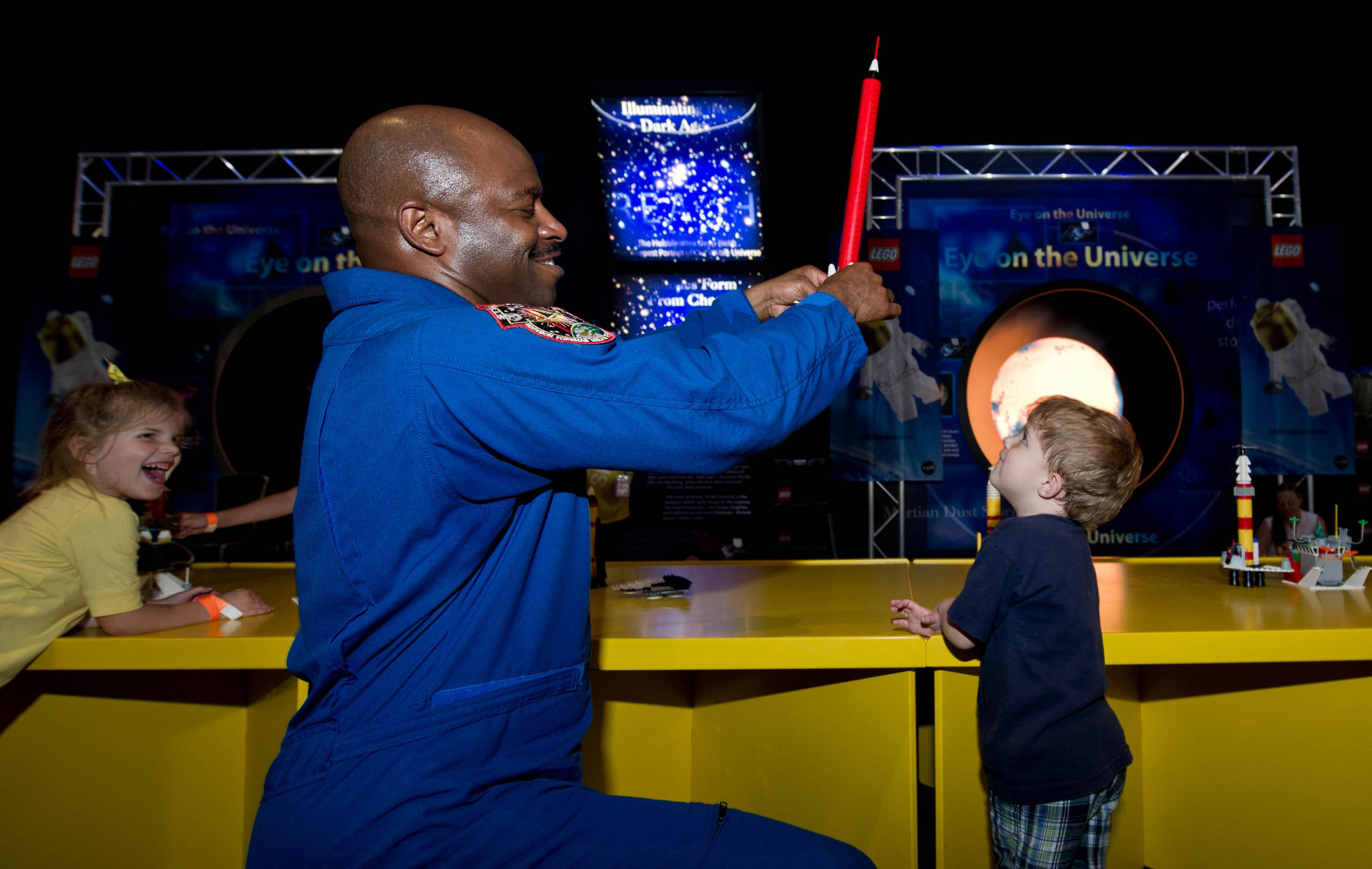
Melvin, center, blasts off a rocket for young participants at a 'Build the Future' event sponsored by LEGO at the Kennedy Space Center Visitor's Complex.

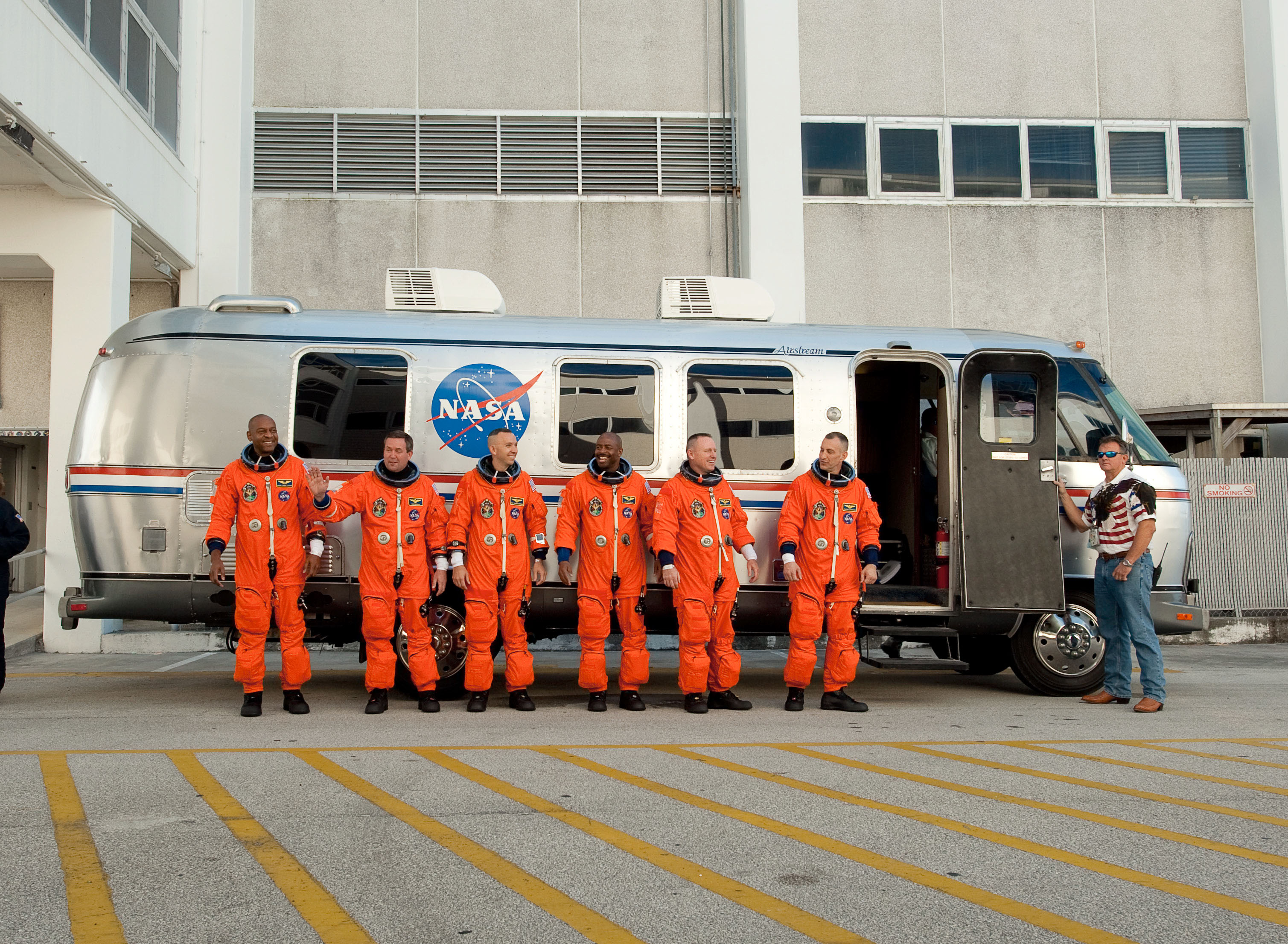
Melvin (center) with STS-129 crew members boarding the astrovan

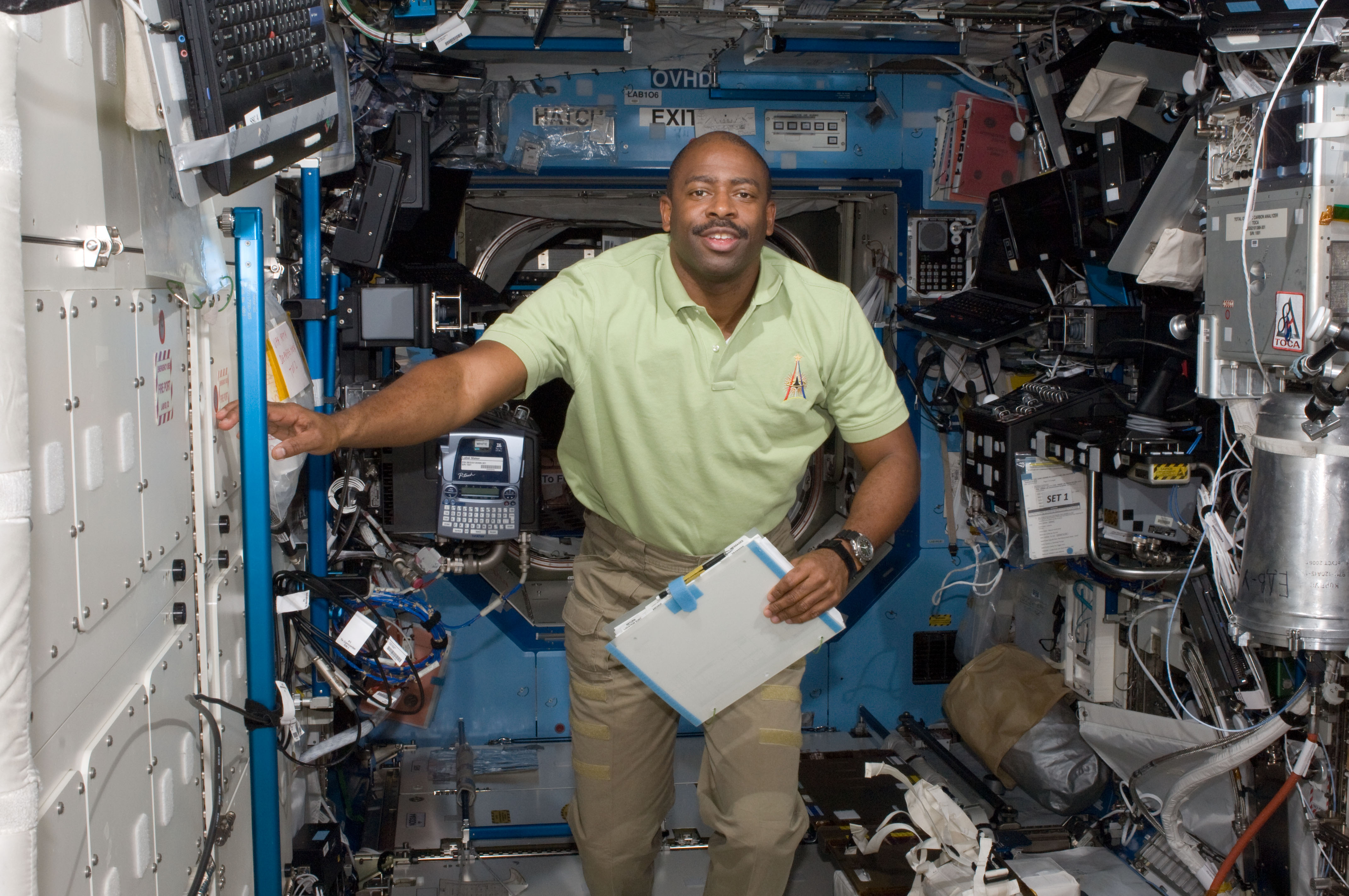
Leland Melvin inside the US lab

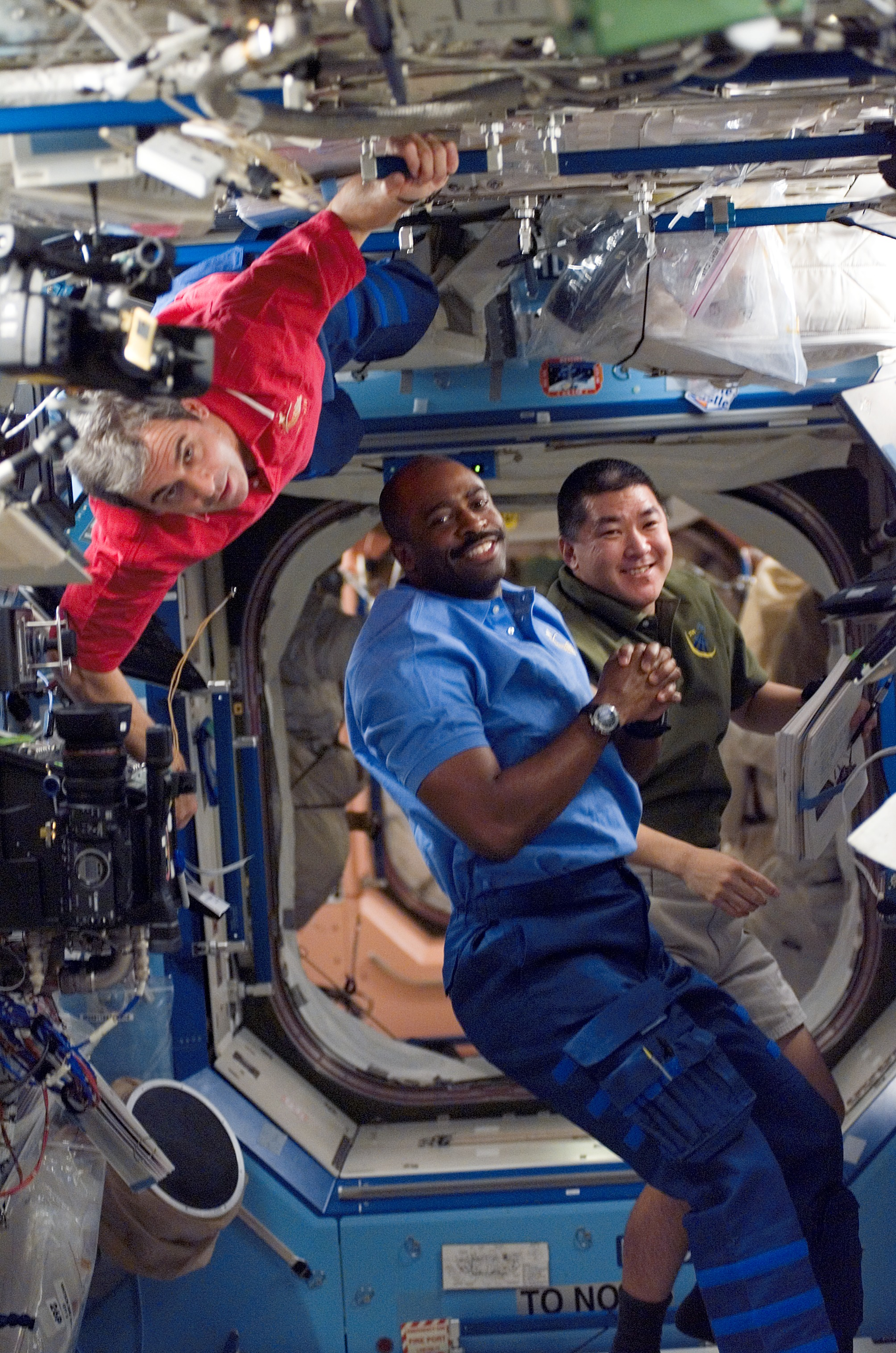
Leland with his crewmates in the Destiny lab during STS-122

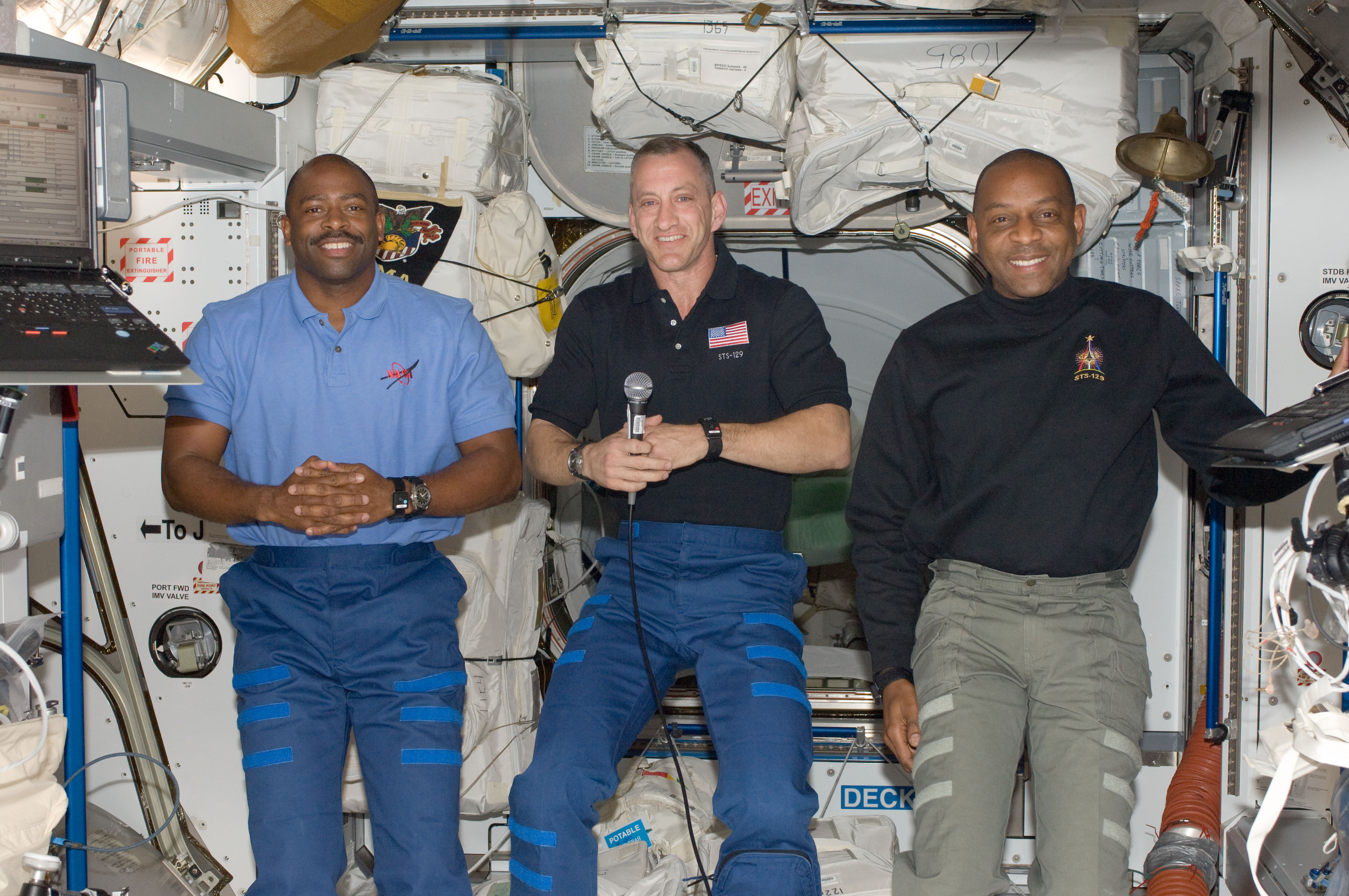
STS-129 crew commander, Robert Satcher and Leland Melvin in Node 2 of the International Space Station

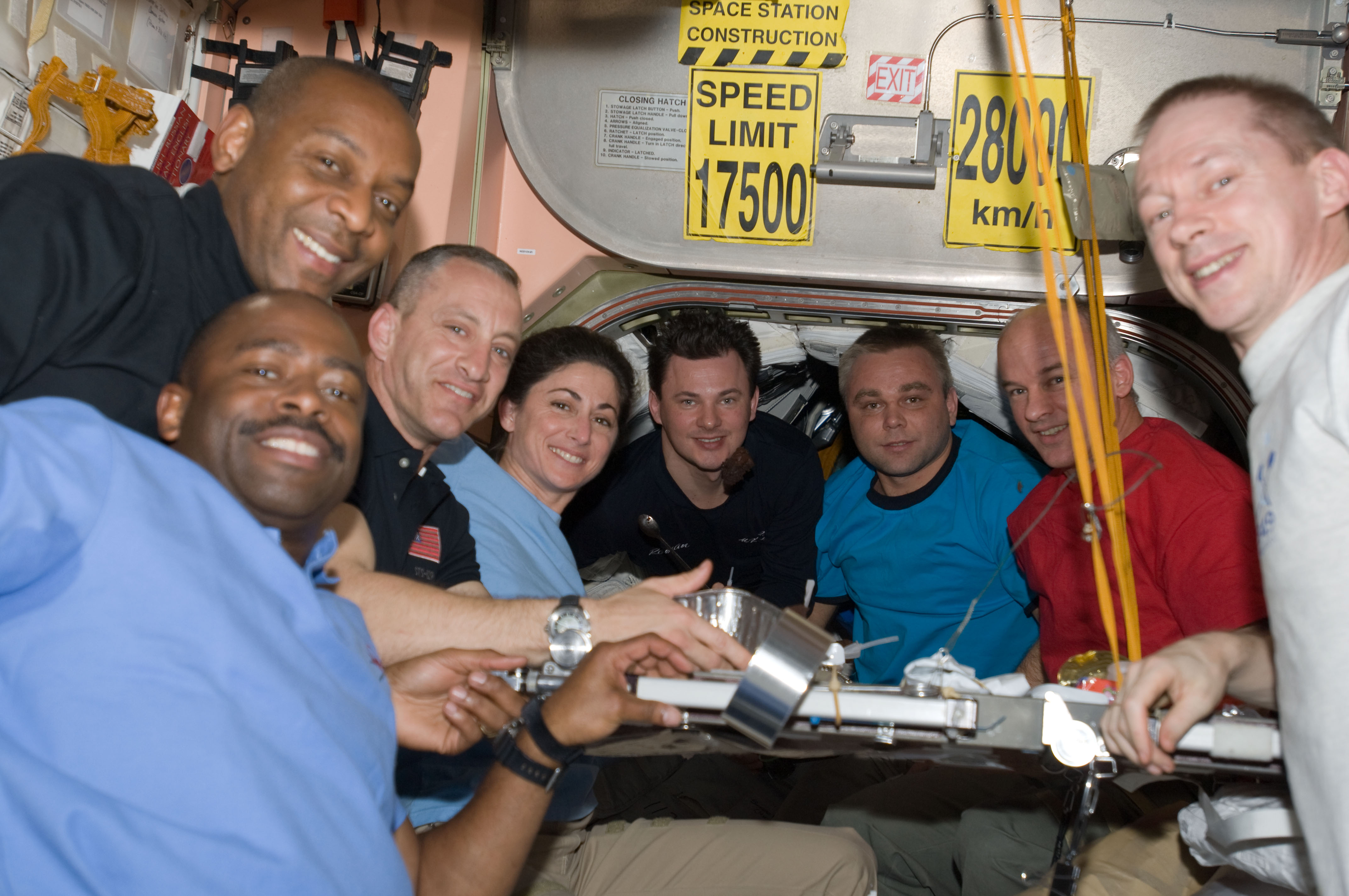
STS-129 crew members in Node 1

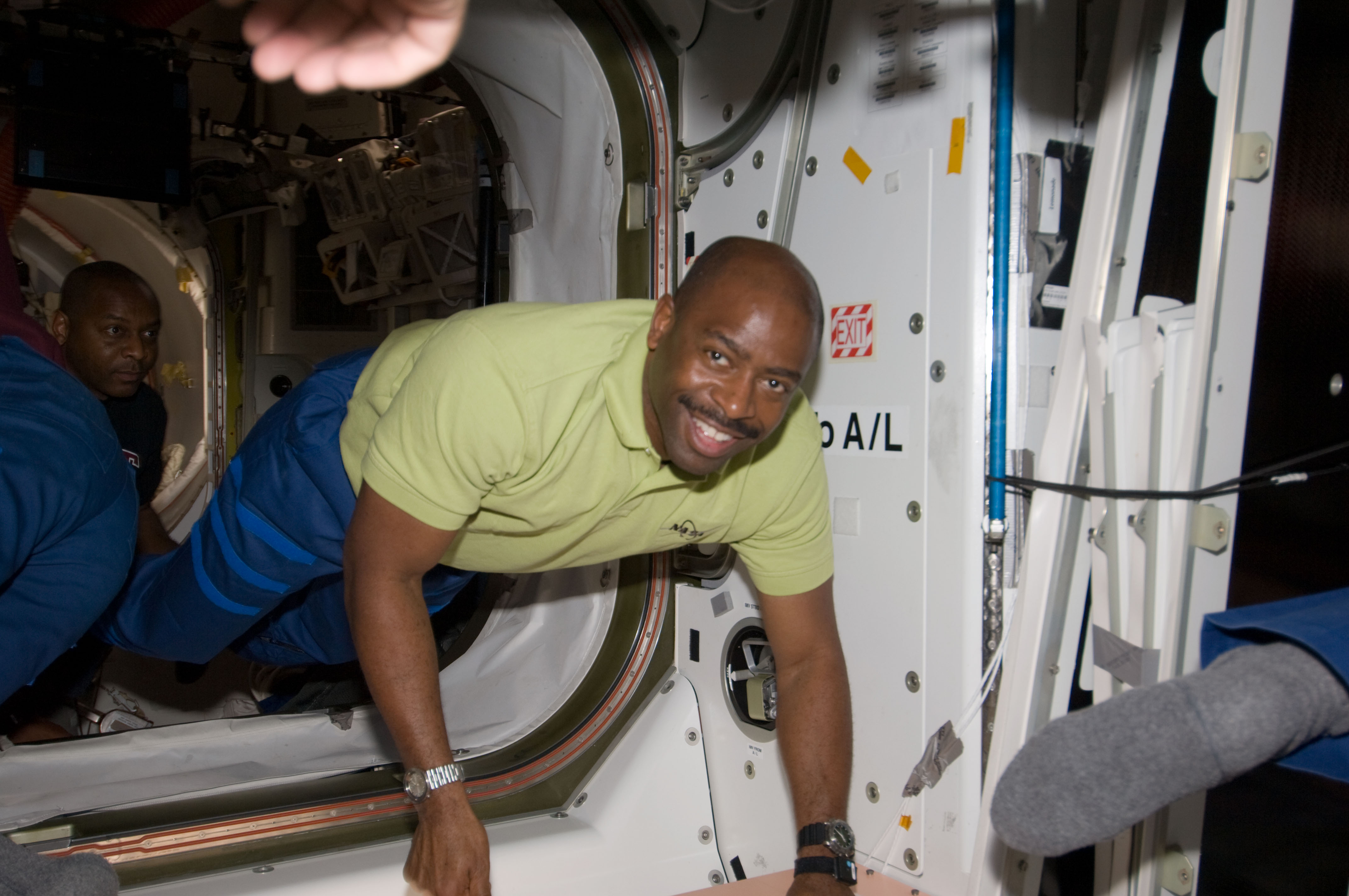
Leland floating inside the Airlock.

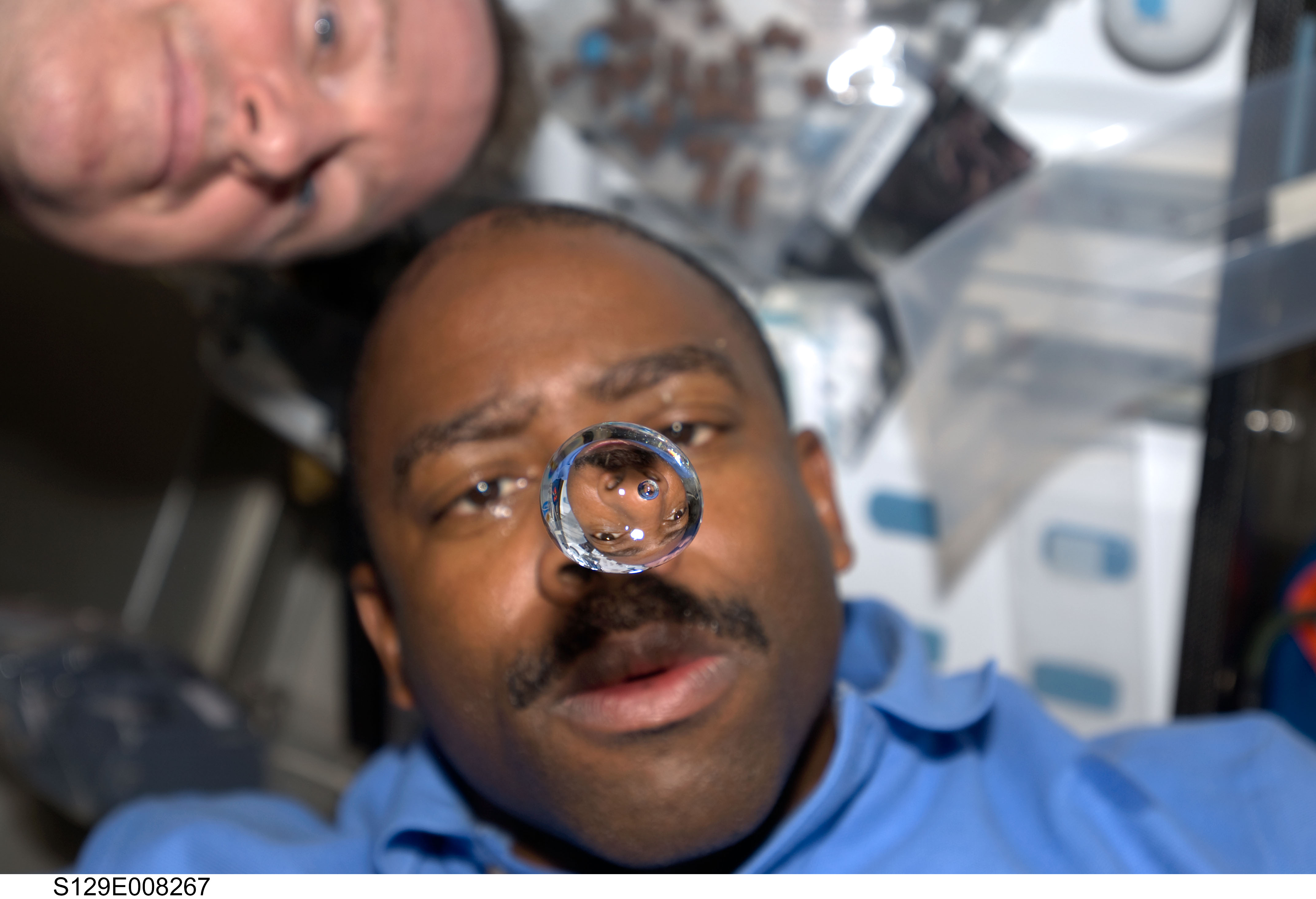
Floating water. Barry E. Wilmore photobombing.

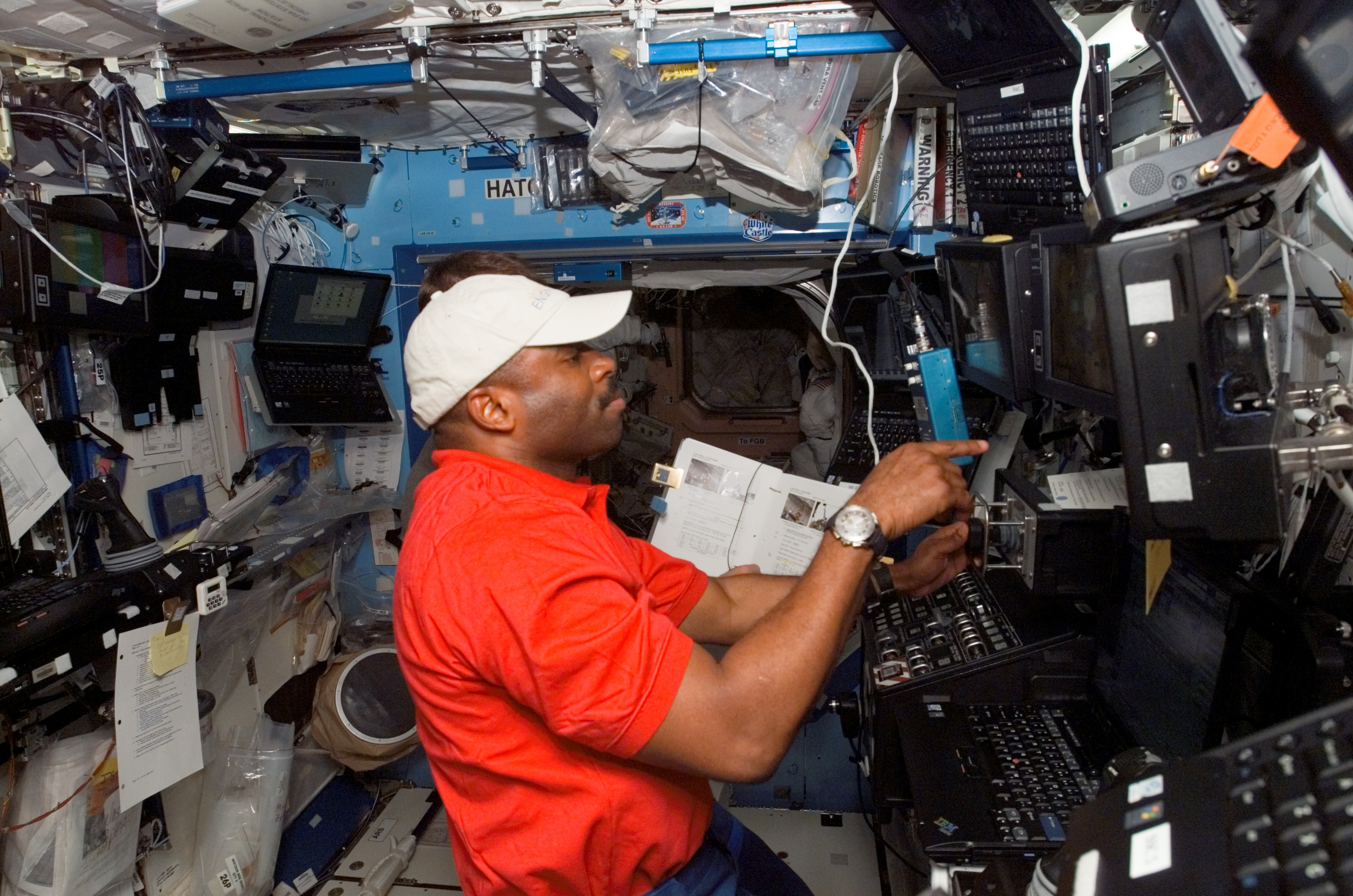
Working on Robotic equipment in the US lab

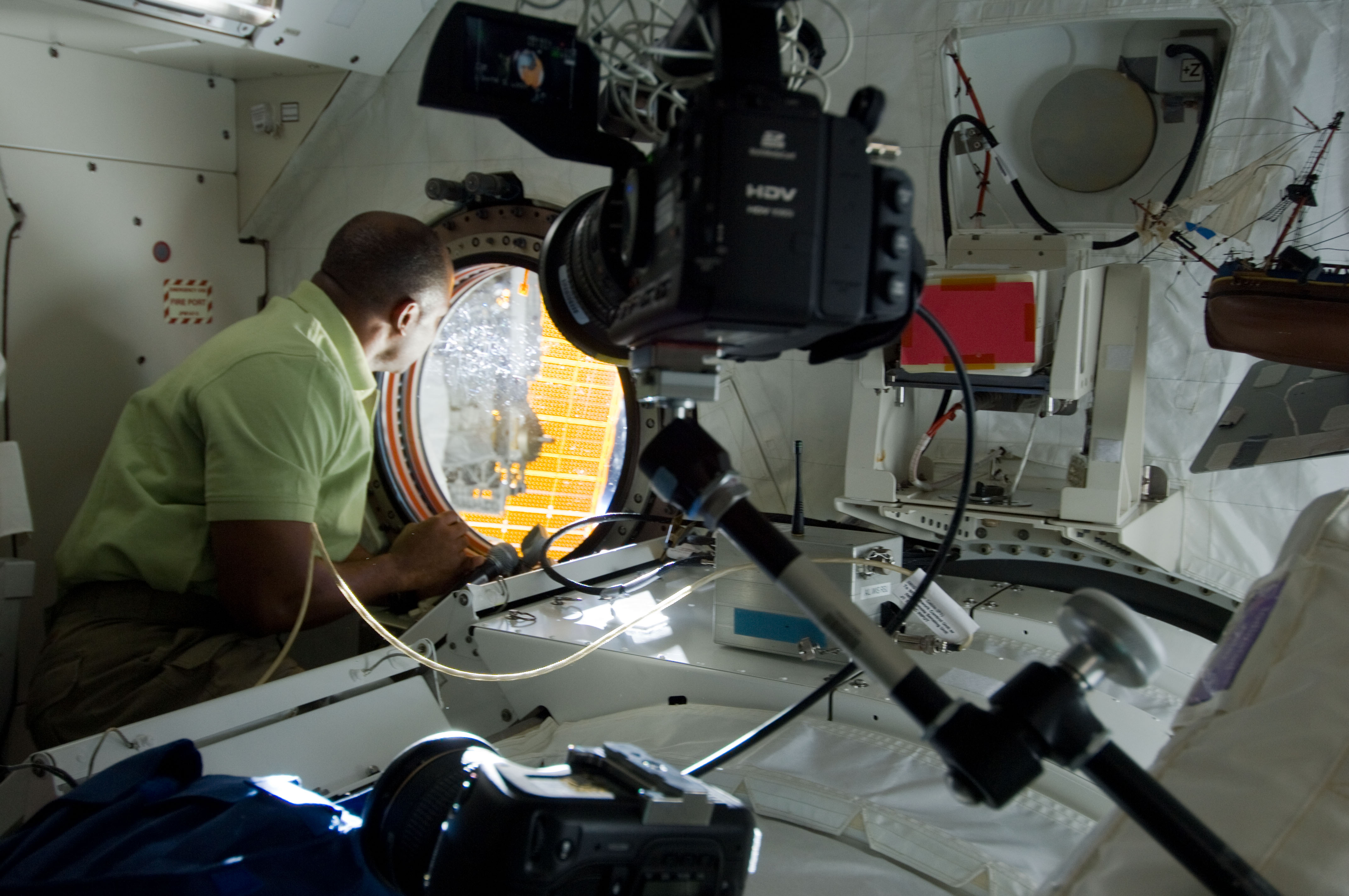
Melvin inside the JEM

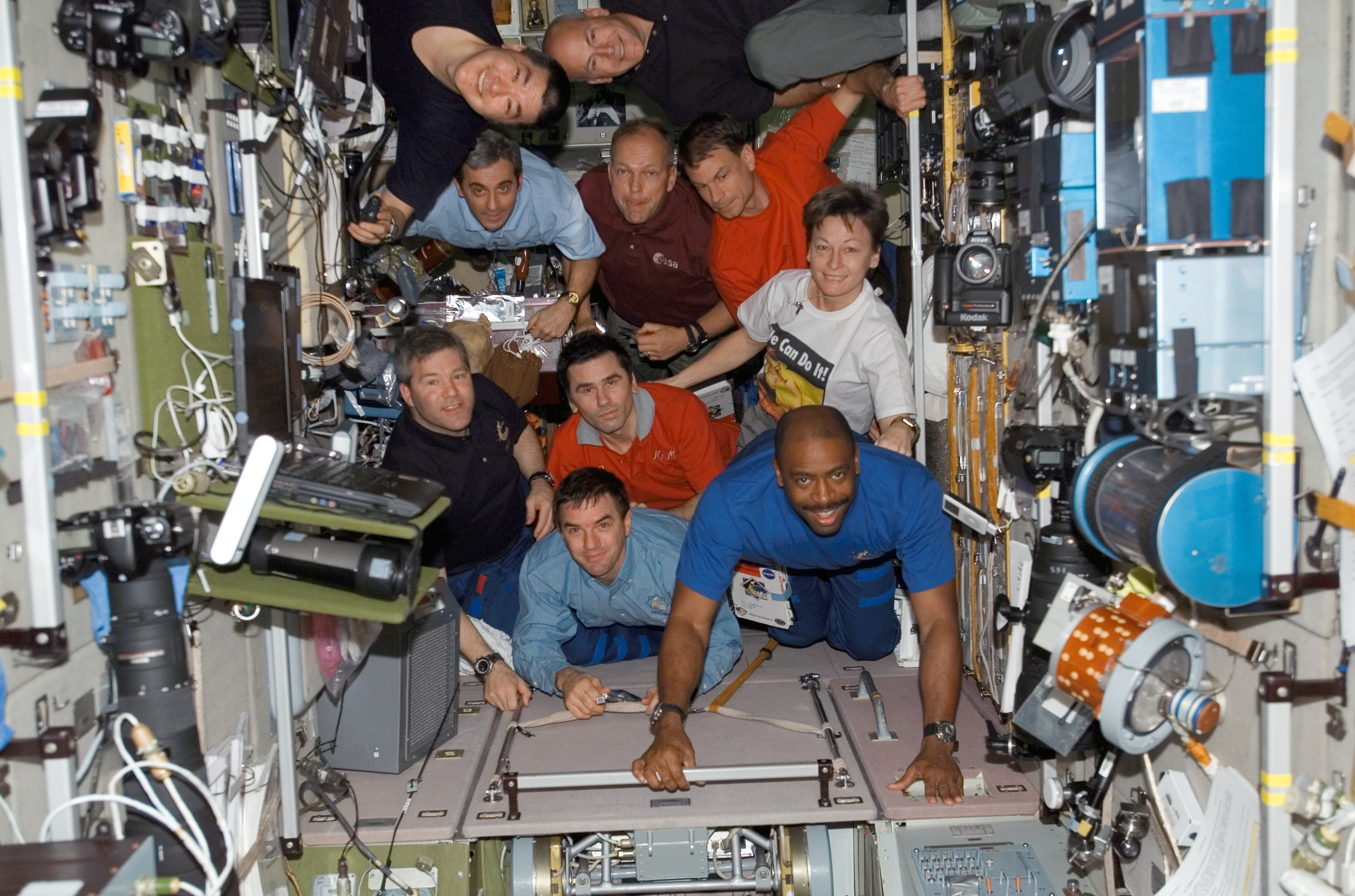
Inside the Zvezda Service Module during STS-122

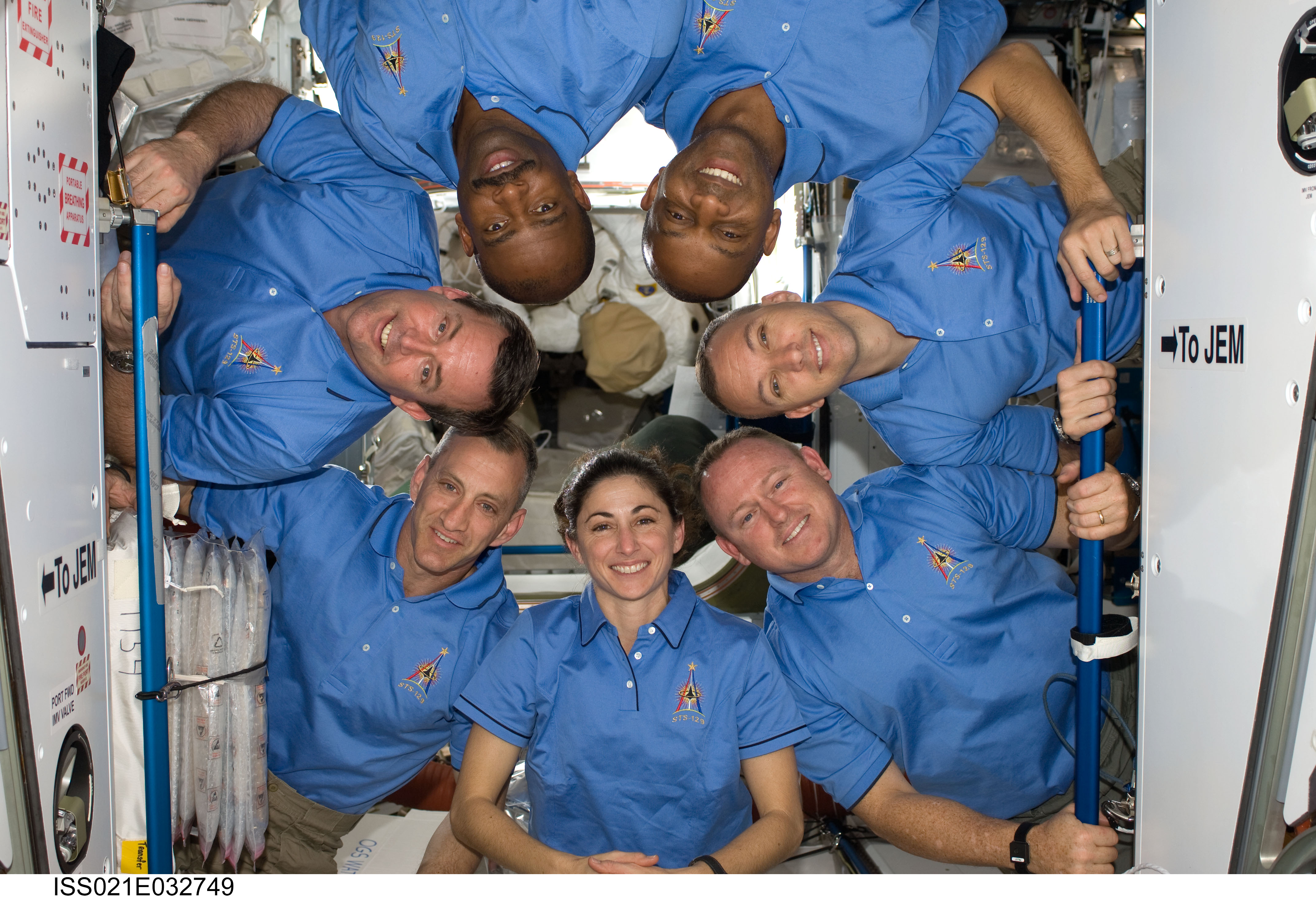
Melvin (upper left), Robert Satcher (upper right) and Nicole Stott form a crew photo circle in Node 2 during STS-129

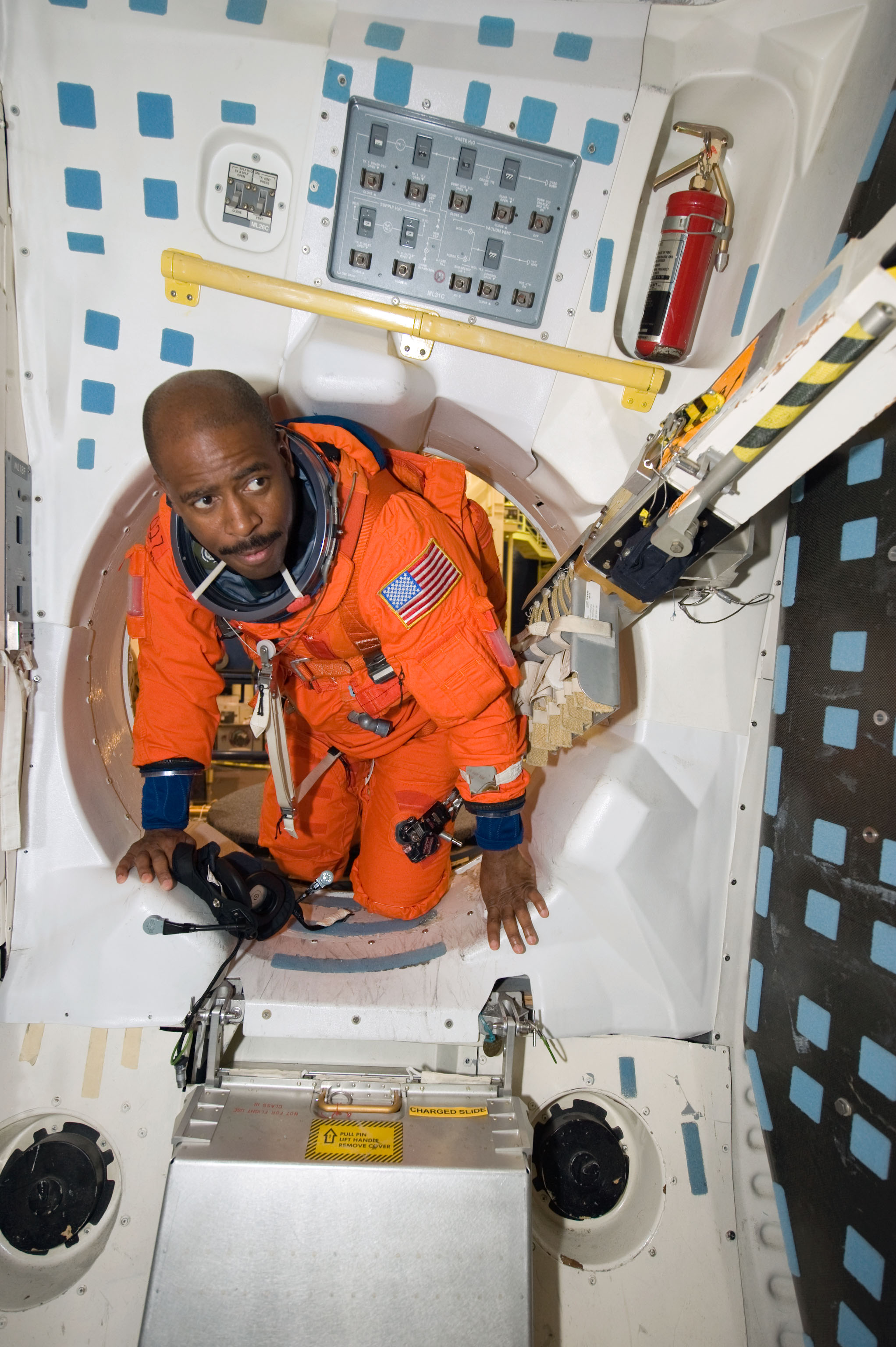
Shuttle training

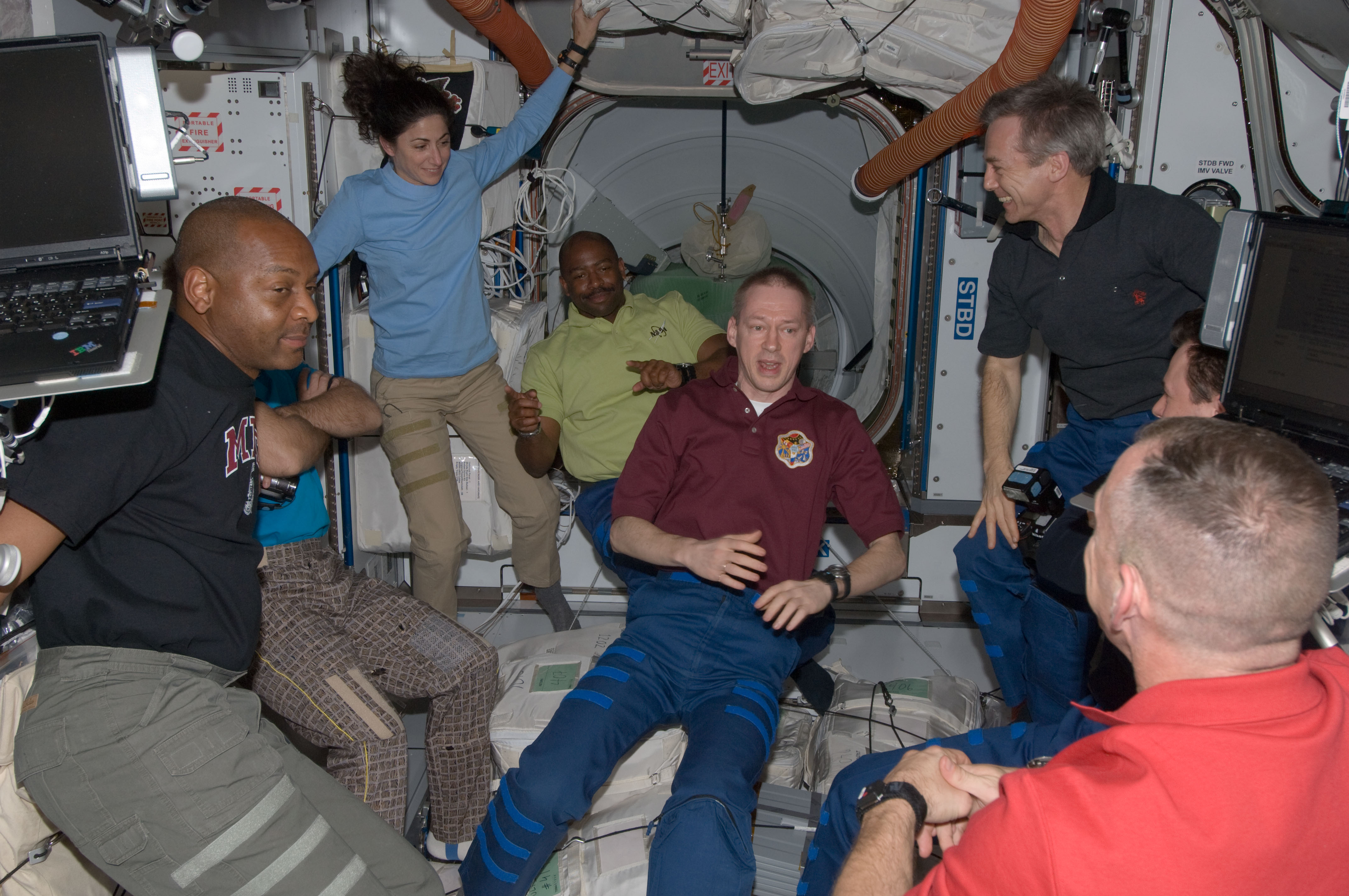
STS-129 docking welcome event

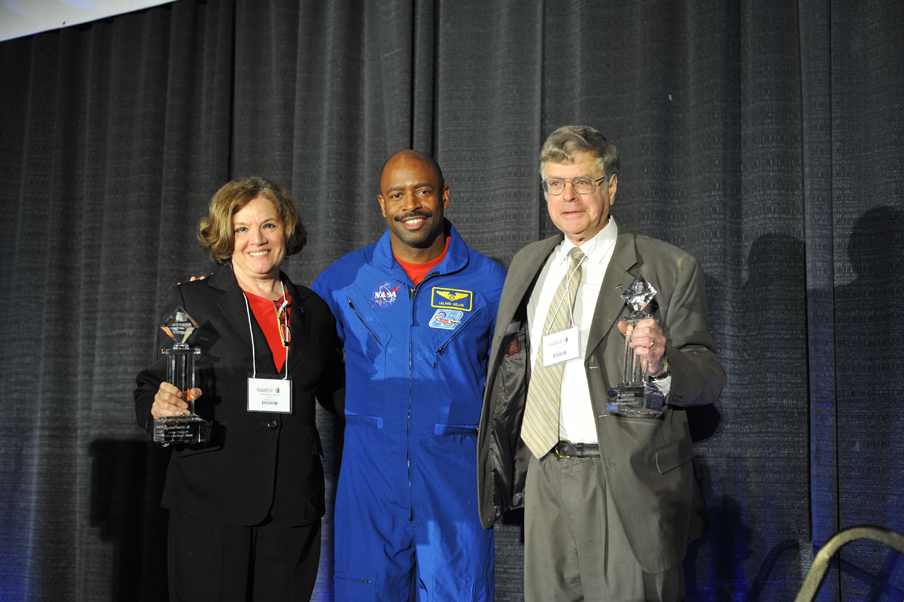
Melvin presents Arlene and Joel Levine with the National Alliance of Black School Educators Presidential Award.

== See also ==
- List of African-American astronauts
