= Cory Ohnesorge =

American football player (born 1984)

No. 18
- Position: Punter

Personal information
- Born: May 22, 1984 (age 42); Oceanside, California, U.S.
- Listed height: 6 ft 4 in (1.93 m)
- Listed weight: 208 lb (94 kg)

Career information
- College: Occidental

Career history
- New York Giants (2007)*; Omaha Nighthawks (2012)
- * Offseason or practice squad member only

Cory Ohnesorge (born May 22, 1984) is an American former football punter.

== Early life ==
Ohnesorge prepped at El Camino High School in Oceanside, California.

== College career ==
Ohnesorge played college football at Occidental College and was a two-time D3football.com All-American selection. During the 2005 season, Cory led all collegiate punters in average punt distance. After graduation, Ohnesorge trained at Occidental while coaching football at his alma mater, El Camino High School. He attended the Ray Pelfrey Professional Kicking Camp in Reno, Nevada in March 2007.

== Professional career ==
Ohnesorge was an offseason signing of the New York Giants and attended the team's rookie minicamp. He was cut on September 1, 2007.
