= STS-129 =

2009 American crewed spaceflight to the ISS

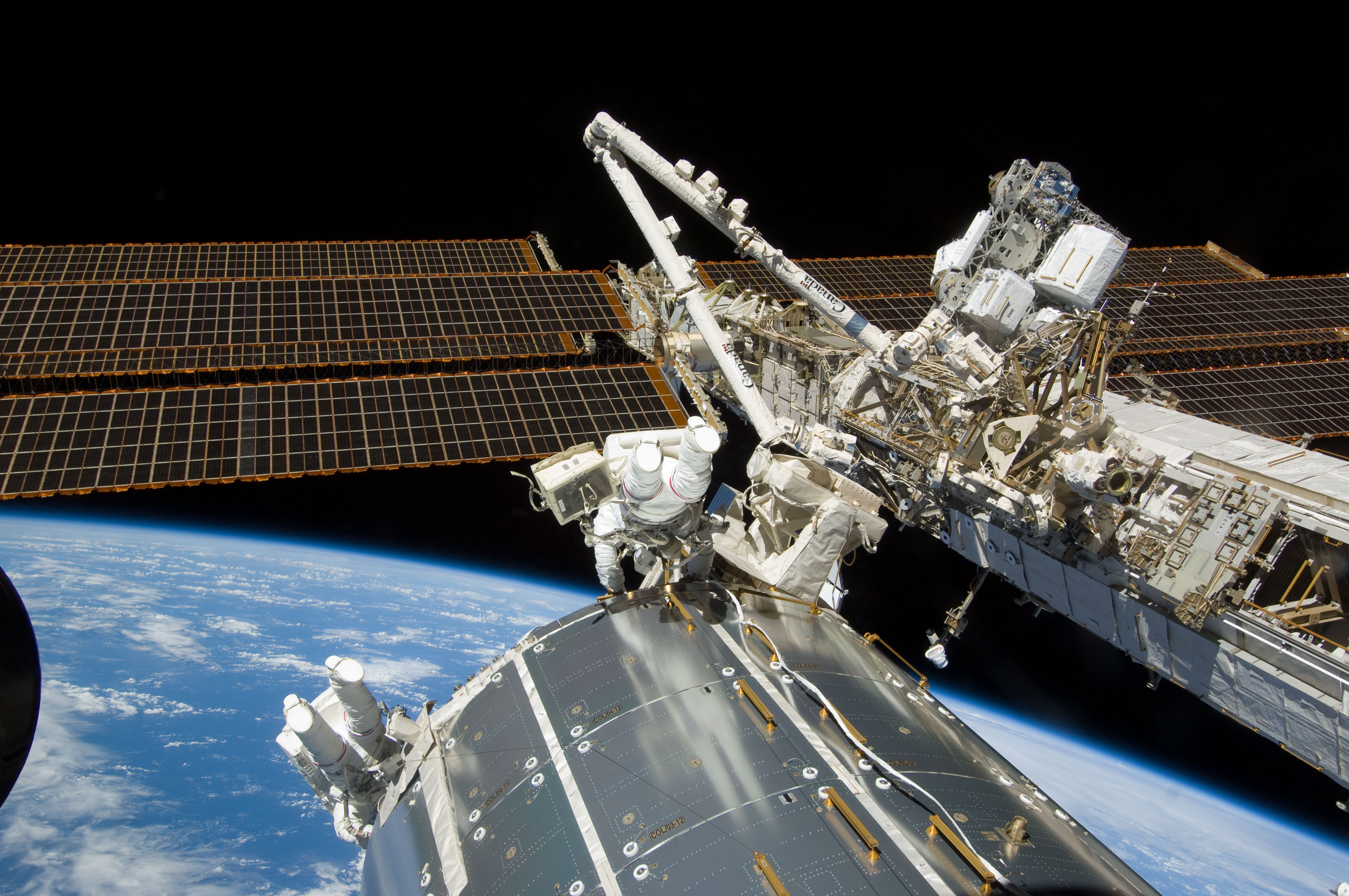
- Bresnik (left) and Foreman (center) working on Columbus' exterior during the mission's second EVA
- Names: Space Transportation System-129
- Mission type: ISS logistics
- Operator: NASA
- COSPAR ID: 2009-062A
- SATCAT no.: 36094
- Mission duration: 10 days, 19 hours, 16 minutes, 13 seconds
- Distance travelled: 7,226,177 kilometres (4,490,138 mi)
- Orbits completed: 171

Spacecraft properties
- Spacecraft: Space Shuttle Atlantis
- Launch mass: 120,848 kilograms (266,424 lb)
- Dry mass: 93,063 kilograms (205,168 lb)

Crew
- Crew size: 6 up 7 down
- Members: Charles O. Hobaugh; Barry E. Wilmore; Leland Melvin; Randolph Bresnik; Michael Foreman; Robert Satcher
- Landing: Nicole P. Stott

Start of mission
- Launch date: November 16, 2009, 19:28:09 UTC
- Launch site: Kennedy, LC-39A

End of mission
- Landing date: November 27, 2009, 14:44:22 UTC
- Landing site: Kennedy, SLF Runway 33

Orbital parameters
- Reference system: Geocentric
- Regime: Low Earth
- Perigee altitude: 343 kilometres (213 mi)
- Apogee altitude: 356 kilometres (221 mi)
- Inclination: 51.6 degrees
- Period: 91 minutes

Docking with ISS
- Docking port: PMA-2 (Harmony forward)
- Docking date: November 18, 2009, 16:51 UTC
- Undocking date: November 25, 2009, 09:53 UTC
- Time docked: 6 days, 17 hours, 2 minutes
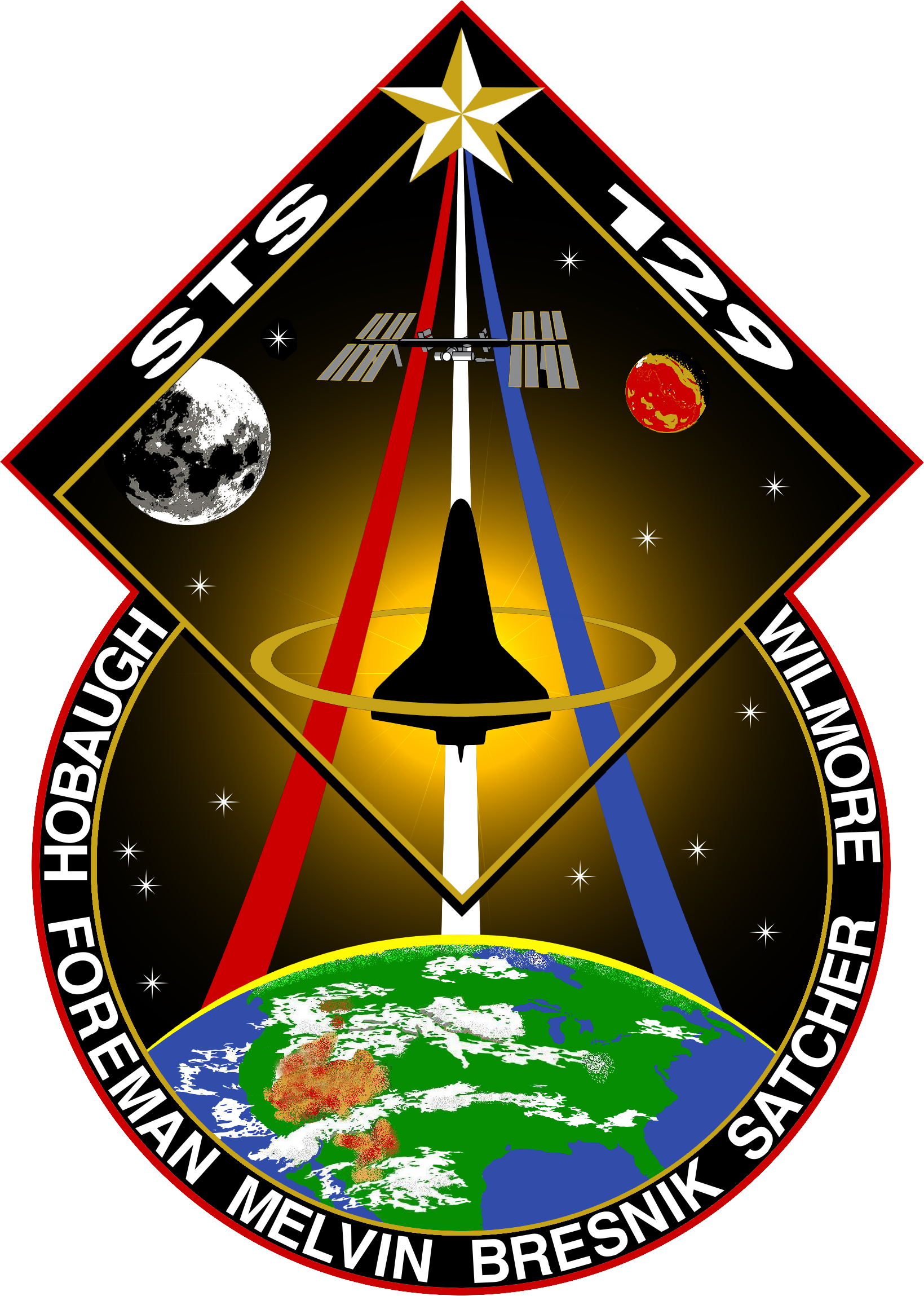
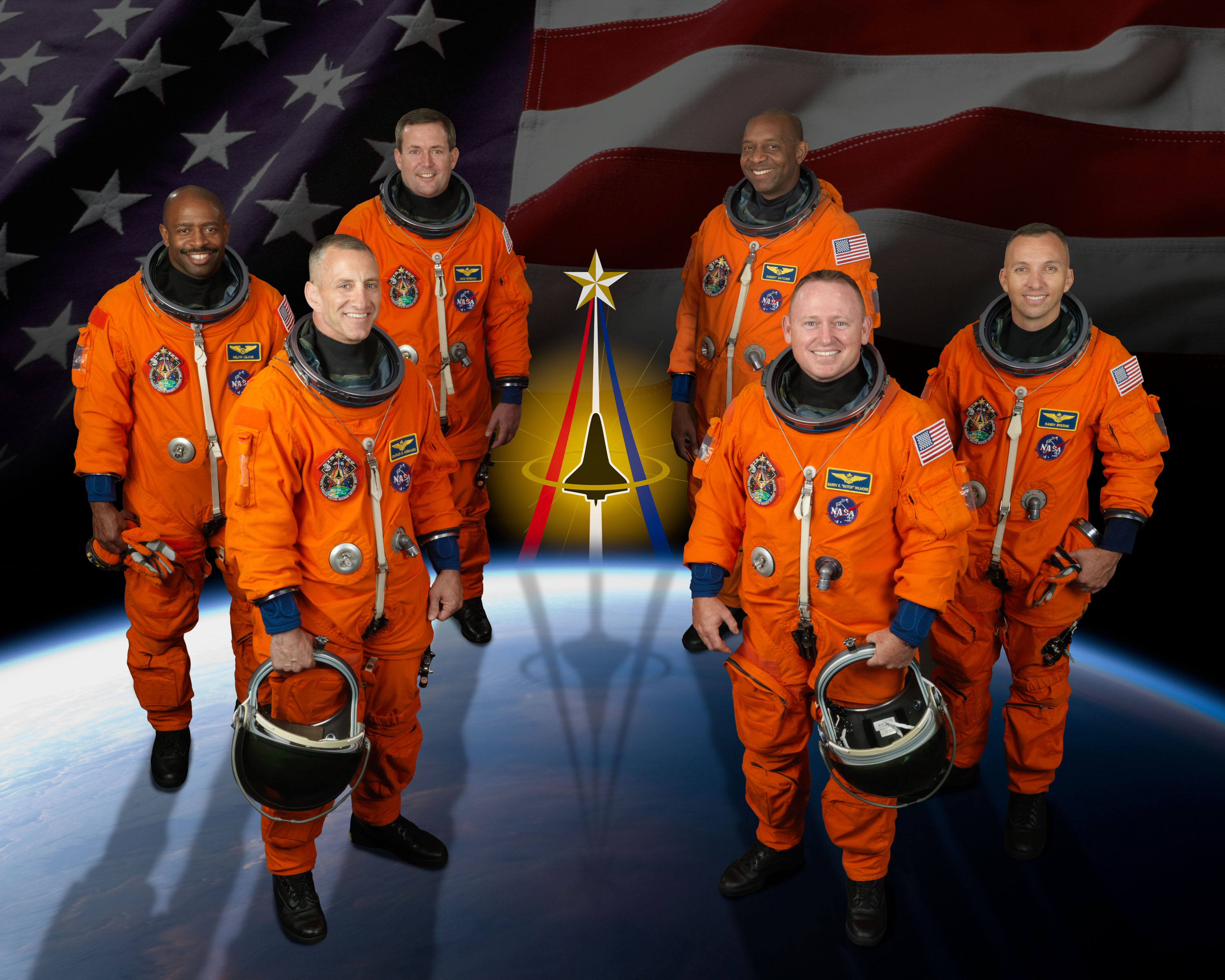
- Front row (l–r) are Hobaugh and Wilmore. Back row (l–r) are Melvin, Foreman, Satcher and Bresnik. Space Shuttle program

STS-129 (ISS assembly flight ULF3) was a NASA Space Shuttle mission to the International Space Station (ISS). Atlantis was launched on November 16, 2009, at 14:28 EST, and landed at 09:44 EST on November 27, 2009, on runway 33 at the Kennedy Space Center's Shuttle Landing Facility. It was also the last Shuttle mission of the 2000s decade.

STS-129 focused on staging spare components outside the station. The 11-day flight included three spacewalks. The payload bay carried two large ExPRESS Logistics Carriers holding two spare gyroscopes, two nitrogen tank assemblies, two pump modules, an ammonia tank assembly, a spare latching end effector for the station's robotic arm, a spare trailing umbilical system for the Mobile Transporter, and a high-pressure gas tank. STS-129 was the first flight of an ExPRESS Logistics Carrier. The completion of this mission left six Space Shuttle flights remaining until the end of the Space Shuttle program, after STS-135 was approved in February 2011.

== Crew ==
Position	Launching Astronaut	Landing Astronaut
Commander	Charles O. Hobaugh; Third and last spaceflight	
Pilot	Barry E. Wilmore; First spaceflight	
Mission Specialist 1	Leland D. Melvin; Second and last spaceflight	
Mission Specialist 2 Flight Engineer	Randolph Bresnik; First spaceflight	
Mission Specialist 3	Michael Foreman; Second and last spaceflight	
Mission Specialist 4	Robert Satcher; Only spaceflight	
Mission Specialist 5	None	Nicole Stott; First spaceflight
Robert Thirsk from CSA was originally slated to return from his stay aboard the station with STS-129, but due to flight delays, it was announced that Stott and Thirsk would swap return seats, with Stott returning aboard STS-129, and Thirsk returning on Soyuz TMA-15. STS-129 was the final Space Shuttle crew rotation flight to or from the ISS. STS-129 was the 2nd flight to carry two African-American astronauts, Leland Melvin and Robert Satcher. The first was STS-116, which included Robert Curbeam and Joan Higginbotham.

=== Crew seat assignments ===
Seat	Launch	Landing	Seats 1–4 are on the flight deck. Seats 5–7 are on the mid-deck.
1	Hobaugh		Seats 1–4 are on the flight deck. Seats 5–7 are on the mid-deck.
2	Wilmore		Seats 1–4 are on the flight deck. Seats 5–7 are on the mid-deck.
3	Melvin	Bresnik	Seats 1–4 are on the flight deck. Seats 5–7 are on the mid-deck.
4	Bresnik	Melvin	Seats 1–4 are on the flight deck. Seats 5–7 are on the mid-deck.
5	Foreman		Seats 1–4 are on the flight deck. Seats 5–7 are on the mid-deck.
6	Satcher		Seats 1–4 are on the flight deck. Seats 5–7 are on the mid-deck.
7	Unused	Stott	Seats 1–4 are on the flight deck. Seats 5–7 are on the mid-deck.

== Mission payload ==
Location	Cargo	Mass
Bays 1–2	Orbiter Docking System; EMU 3010 / EMU 3008	1,800 kilograms (4,000 lb); ~260 kilograms (570 lb)
Bay 3P	Shuttle Power; Distribution Unit (SPDU)	~17 kilograms (37 lb)
Bay 3S	SPA/S-band Antenna (SASA)	272 kilograms (600 lb)
Bay 4P	APC/MISSE 7A	98 kilograms (216 lb)
Bay 4S	APC/MISSE 7A	98 kilograms (216 lb)
Bays 6–9	EXPRESS Logistics Carrier ELC-1	6,396 kilograms (14,101 lb)
Bay 9P	ROEU umbilical	~79 kilograms (174 lb)
Bay 9S	ROEU umbilical	~79 kilograms (174 lb)
Bays 10–13	EXPRESS Logistics Carrier ELC-2	6,136 kilograms (13,528 lb)
Starboard Sill	Orbiter Boom Sensor System	~382 kilograms (842 lb)
Port Sill	Canadarm 301	410 kilograms (900 lb)
	Total:	16,027 kilograms (35,333 lb)

=== ExPRESS Logistics Carriers 1 and 2 ===
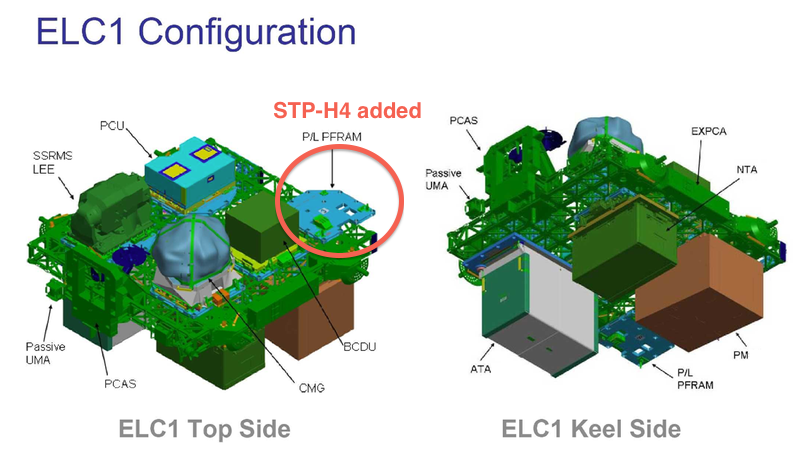
ELC-1 in its launch configuration

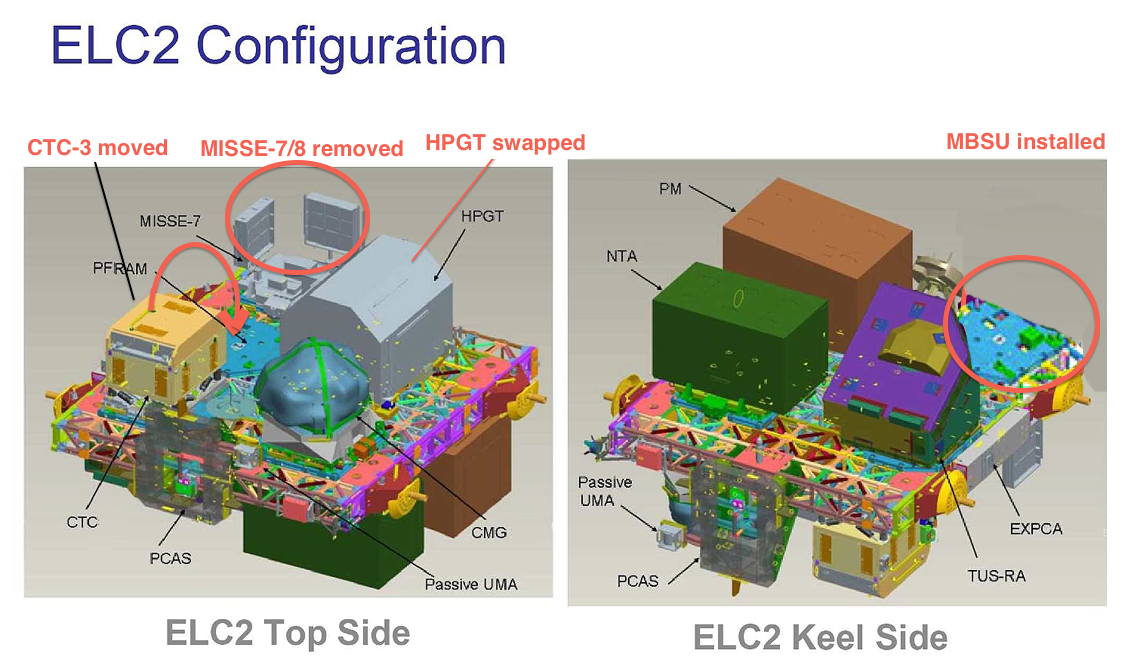
ELC-2 in its launch configuration

The primary payload of STS-129 was the ExPRESS (Expedite the Processing of Experiments to the Space Station) Logistics Carrier (ELC-1) and the ELC-2. Each steel framework has a mass capacity of 9,800 pounds (4,400 kg), with a volume of 30 m³ (total with spares, ELC-1: 13,850 pounds (6,280 kg) and ELC-2: 13,400 pounds (6,100 kg)). The Goddard Space Flight Center served as the overall integrator for ELC-1 and ELC-2, with the addition of components manufactured by the Brazilian Space Agency.

The spare hardware stored on ELC-1 includes an Ammonia Tank Assembly, a Battery Charger Discharge Unit, a station robotic arm Latching End Effector, a Control Moment Gyroscope, a Nitrogen Tank Assembly, a Pump Module, a Plasma Contactor Unit and two empty Passive Flight Releasable Attachment Mechanisms.

ELC-2 was launched with an oxygen-filled High Pressure Gas Tank (HPGT), a Cargo Transport Container (CTC-1), a Mobile Transporter Trailing Umbilical System Reel Assembly (MT TUS-RA), a Control Moment Gyroscope, a Nitrogen Tank Assembly, a Pump Module, MISSE attach hardware and one empty site for future payloads.

ELC-1 was installed on the Unpressurized Cargo Carrier Attachment System #2 (UCCAS 2) on the P3 (port side) segment of the main truss. ELC-2 was installed on the Upper Outboard Payload Attach System on the S3 (Starboard Segment 3) of the main truss.

=== Materials on International Space Station Experiment (MISSE) carrier ===
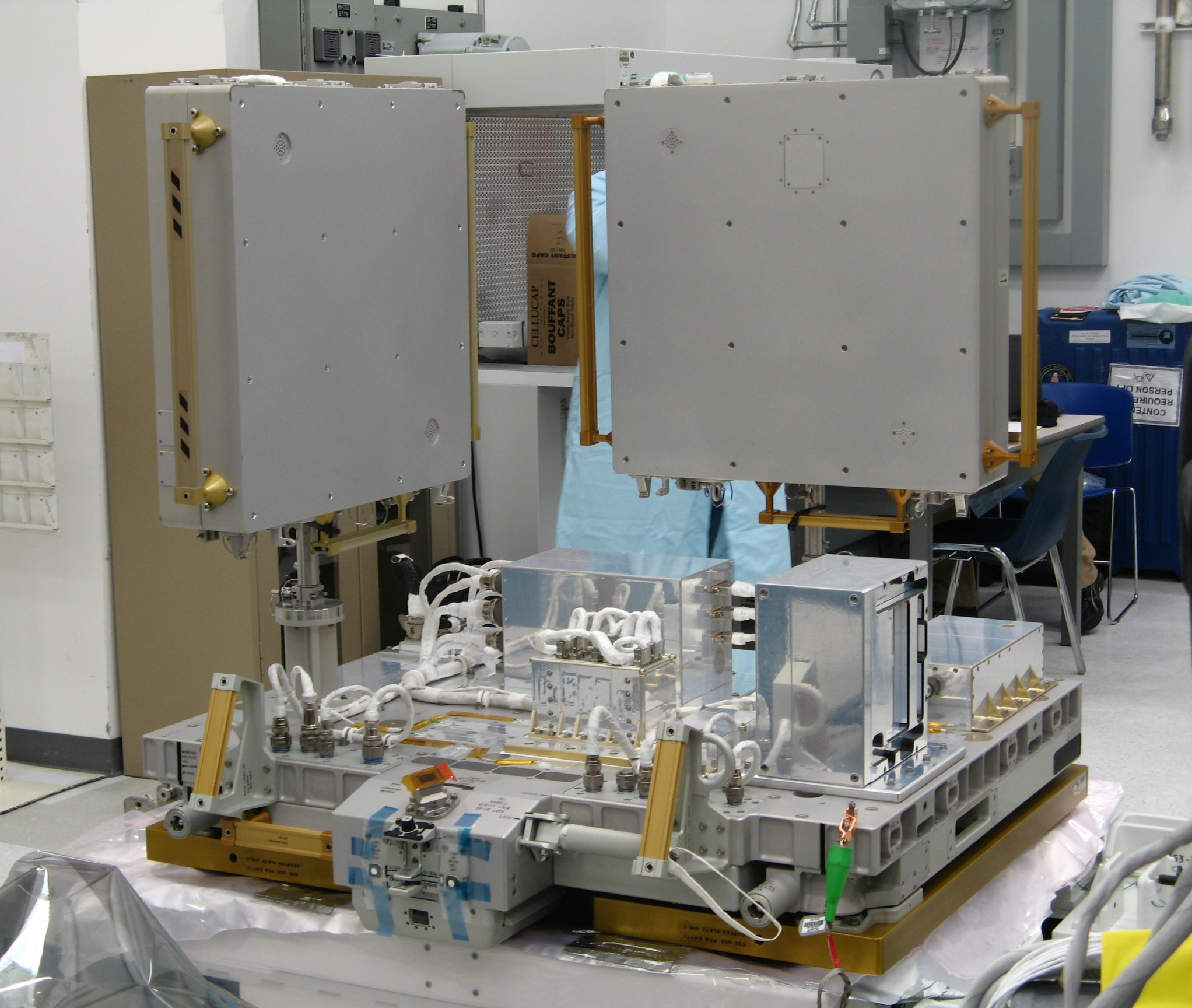
MISSE-7 prior to launch.

ELC2 also carried MISSE-7, an experiment that will expose a variety of materials and coatings being considered for future spacecraft to the extreme conditions outside the space station. The materials are being evaluated for the effects of atomic oxygen, ultraviolet, direct sunlight, radiation, and extremes of heat and cold. The experimental findings will benefit better understanding, development and to test new materials suitable to better withstand the rigors of space environments with applications in the design of future spacecraft.

MISSE-7 is composed of two suitcase-sized Passive Experiment Containers (PECs), identified as MISSE 7A and MISSE 7B. Once installed in the exterior of ISS by space walking astronauts, the PECs are opened. The orientation of MISSE 7A will be space facing/Earth facing while MISSE 7B will face forward/backward relative to the ISS orbit. Both MISSE 7A and MISSE 7B contain active and passive experiments. Passive experiments are designed for pre- and post-flight evaluation in ground-based laboratories.

=== S-band Antenna Sub-Assembly (SASA) package ===
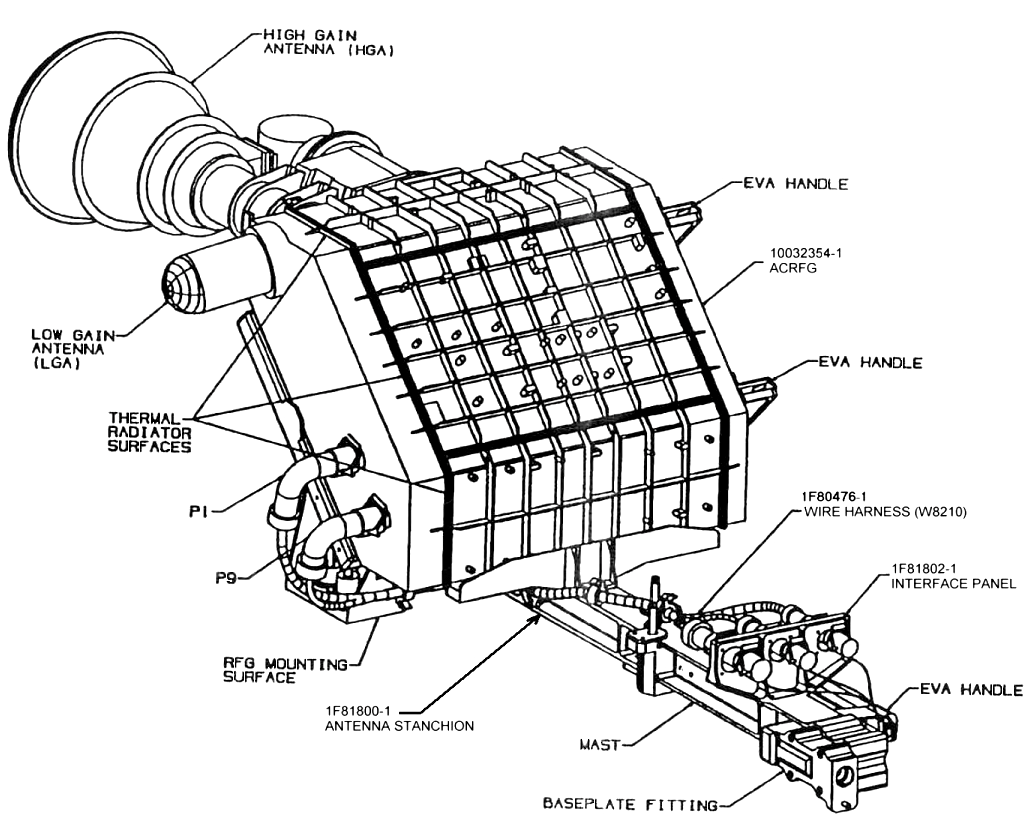
The SASA package

Atlantis delivered a repaired S-band Antenna Sub-Assembly (SASA) to the ISS which was returned to Earth during the STS-120 mission in October 2007. SASA is a space station antenna assembly consisting of

- Assembly Contingency Radio Frequency Group (RFG or ACRFG)
- SASA Boom
- Avionics Wire Harness

Major functions of the ACRFG are to transmit/receive radio signals to/from the transponder, amplification of signals to a power level necessary to be acquired by a Tracking Data and Relay Satellite and to broadcast/receive signals through the selected antenna.

The SASA boom assembly consists of a mast, an extra-vehicular activity (EVA) handle, a harness, a connector panel, a mounting surface for the RFG and a baseplate fitting. The fitting will serve as the structural interface for mounting the SASA to the Zenith 1 truss on the ISS.

The Avionics Wire Harness installed on the SASA Boom provides operational and heater power to the RFG. Another function of the harness is to send command/status/RF signals to and from RFG.

SASA package was attached to the sidewall inside the payload bay of Atlantis during the ascent to the ISS. It was transferred from the payload bay to the Zenith 1 truss for installation as a spare by spacewalkers Foreman and Satcher performing EVA 1 on November 19.

=== SpaceX COTS UHF Communication Unit and Crew Command Panel ===
In a middeck stowage locker, Atlantis carried the Commercial Orbital Transportation Services (COTS) Ultra High Frequency (UHF) Communication Unit (CUCU) developed by Space Exploration Technologies (SpaceX) in collaboration with NASA to the ISS. It will be integrated on the space station in preparation for future SpaceX flights to the orbiting complex. The unit allows for communication between ISS and SpaceX's Dragon spacecraft via a UHF radio. Commands from SpaceX can be forwarded through ISS to CUCU and on to Dragon. Similarly, telemetry from Dragon and CUCU can be forwarded down through ISS for monitoring by SpaceX and NASA ground-based mission control. The Crew Command Panel (CCP) provides feedback about the state of the Dragon vehicle to astronauts aboard ISS. It additionally provides some simple commanding capability to the astronauts to be used during the Dragon approach to ISS.

=== Other items ===
Astronaut Randolph Bresnik carried a scarf worn by the noted American aviation pioneer and author Amelia Earhart. The scarf had been on display at the Ninety-Nines Museum of Women Pilots in Oklahoma City. Bresnik's grandfather, Albert Louis Bresnik, was the personal photographer for Earhart from 1932 until July 2, 1937—the date of her disappearance. After being returned to Earth, the scarf would be placed in a new display at the Museum dedicated to the astronaut's grandfather's photographs.

In addition, the official opening toss-coin for Super Bowl XLIV (see "Pregame" section for the actual coin toss itself) as well as a football with all of the Pro Football Hall of Fame inductees written on it and various other NFL-related, space-flown memorabilia were flown on STS-129.

== Mission experiments ==
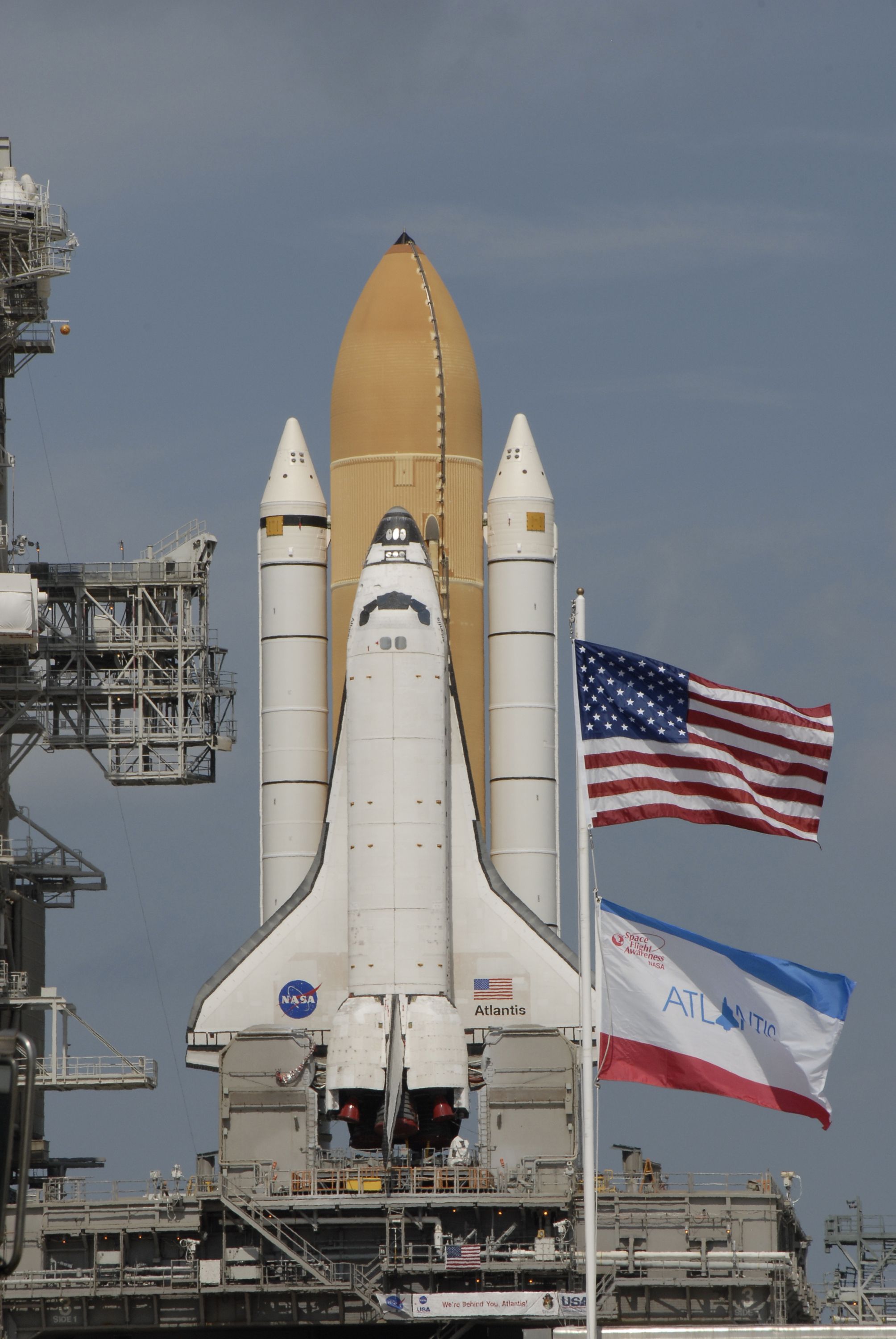
Atlantis at pad 39A after being rolled out from the VAB on October 14, 2009.

The crew of Atlantis worked with several short-term experiments during their mission. Atlantis also transported new long-term experiments to the space station. At the end of the mission, the shuttle will return some of the completed experiments from the ISS.

Short-term experiments included:

1. Shuttle Exhaust Ion Turbulence Experiments (SEITE) – The crew of Atlantis carried out the SEITE burn on Flight Day 11. SEITE uses instrumentation on The Communications/Navigation Outage Forecasting System (C/NOFS) satellite for in situ observations of density and electric field disturbances caused by the shuttle Orbital Maneuvering System (OMS) engine exhaust plume. The scope of the research is to enhance the surveillance of space, real-time characterization, detection and tracking and timely surveillance of high interest objects.
2. Shuttle Ionospheric Modification with Pulsed Localized Exhaust Experiments (SIMPLEX) – The crew carried out the SIMPLEX burn on Flight Day 11. The experiment investigates plasma turbulence driven by shuttle exhaust in the ionosphere using ground-based radars. The processes by which chemical releases can produce plasma turbulence are quantified with the SIMPLEX measurements. Plasma turbulence can affect military navigation and communications using radio systems. They can also be used to promote communications by opening radio channels at abnormally high frequencies.

New experiments delivered to the space station included:

1. Microbe experiment – An experiment developed by Texas Southern University (TSU) students in Houston that aims to study how microbes (Escherichia coli and Bacillus subtilis) grow under weightless conditions in space. Students at TSU, Center for Bionanotechnology and Environmental Research (CBER) will share experimental data with K-12 students nationwide. Visit https://web.archive.org/web/20091204135023/http://www.tsu.edu/pages/3611.asp to obtain additional information on the experiment named "URC Microbial 1"or to download fact sheet use
2. Butterflies in Space Program – The shuttle carried a suitcase sized payload holding larvae of painted lady butterflies and monarch butterflies to the space station. Researchers at the University of Colorado in Boulder expect to compare the space caterpillars with butterfly larvae raised on Earth by students from 100 U.S. elementary and middle schools.
3. Advanced Plant Experiments on orbit (APEX-Cambium project) – This joint Canadian Space Agency/NASA project aims to help determine the role gravity plays in the formation of reaction wood in trees. APEX-Cambium will also carry out a second experiment to detect the effects of stressors in space on gene expression in higher plants.
4. Atlantis transported thousands of the microscopic Caenorhabditis elegans worms that have been sent from the University of Nottingham, UK to the ISS. The worms are expected to suffer similar muscle loss to humans and will be stored inside the Kibo laboratory. They will be used to study the effect of zero gravity on the human body's muscle development and physiology. Several potential treatments for muscle loss will be tested on the creatures and the research findings will pave the way for treatments to be safely tested on astronauts.

For a comprehensive list of all STS-129 experiments and more information, see footnote

== Mission background and milestones ==
The mission marked:

- 160th NASA crewed space flight
- 129th shuttle mission since STS-1
- 31st flight of Atlantis
- 31st shuttle mission to the ISS
- 5th shuttle flight in 2009
- 104th post-Challenger mission
- 16th post-Columbia mission

The STS-129 mission marked NASA's fifth NASA Tweetup, and its first such event ever held during a Shuttle launch at Kennedy Space Center in Cape Canaveral, Florida. One hundred members of the general public, representing Morocco, New Zealand, the United Kingdom and 21 U.S. states, in addition to the District of Columbia, attended the two-day event and, for a time, the #nasatweetup hashtag reached #3 on Twitter's trending topics.

== Launch window ==
The November 2009 launch window of Atlantis, between November 16 and 20, was complicated by the launch of the Mini-Russian Research Module 2 (MRM-2) aboard a Soyuz-U rocket from the Baikonur Cosmodrome in Kazakhstan. Further conflict was caused by Eastern Range constraints with two other satellite launches from the Cape Canaveral Air Force Station, one at the beginning of the shuttle's launch window and the other at the end. The Eastern Range had been reserved on November 14 and 15, 2009, for the launch of the communications satellite Intelsat 14 aboard an Atlas-V rocket. A Delta-IV rocket carrying a Wideband Global SATCOM satellite was also expected to lift off on November 19, 2009.

On November 10, 2009, MRM-2 was successfully launched, docking with the ISS on the 12th, while on the same day the Delta-IV rocket team announced that they had delayed their launch to a future date, allowing the shuttle to gain additional launch opportunities at the end of the window if it required. Atlas V's launch with the Intelsat 14 was scrubbed on the 14th due to a technical issue requiring a rollback. The scrub, lasting more than 24 hours, meant that Atlantis also avoided a possible postponement of its launch slipping into November 17, 2009.

== Shuttle processing ==
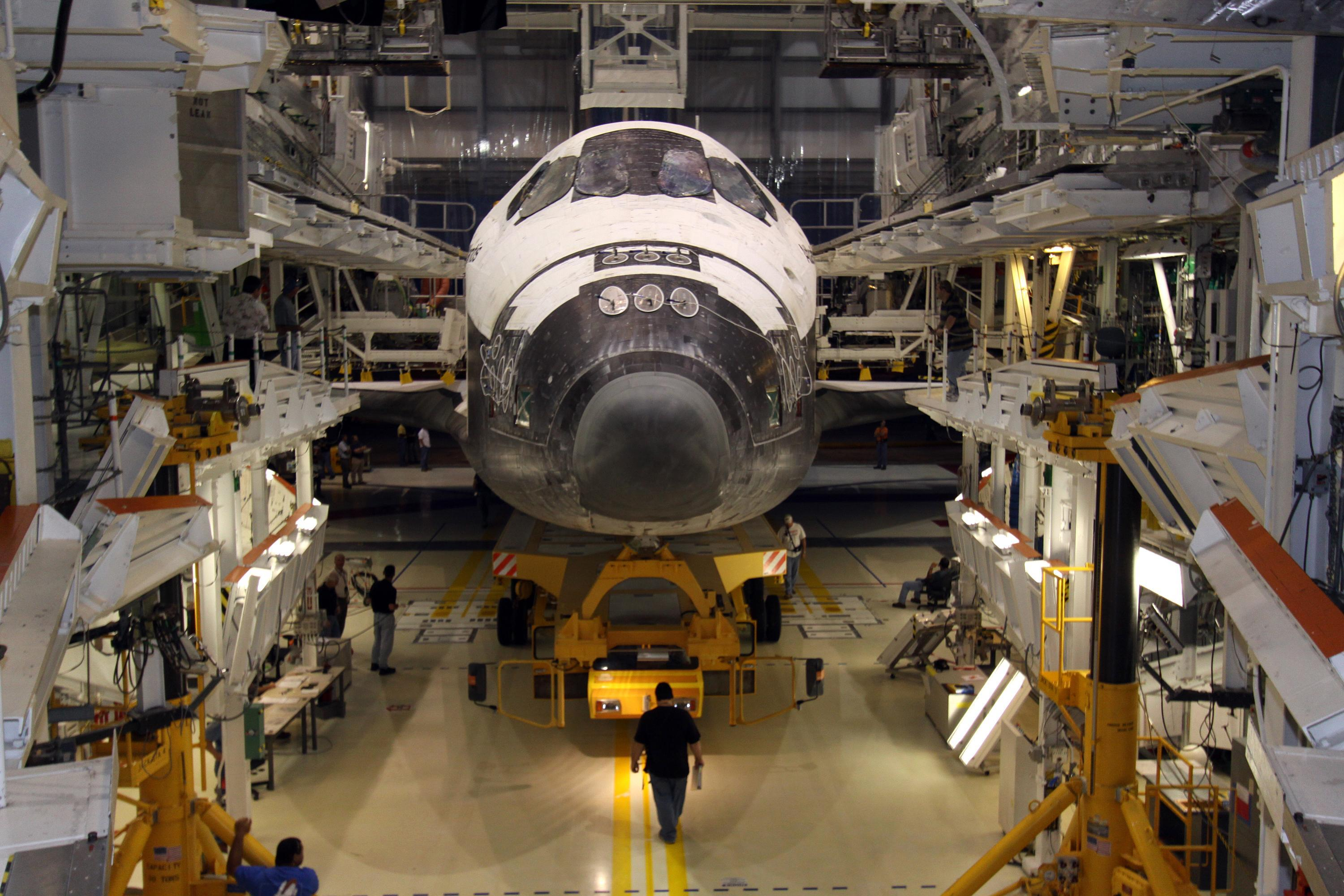
Workers prepare Atlantis prior to STS-129.

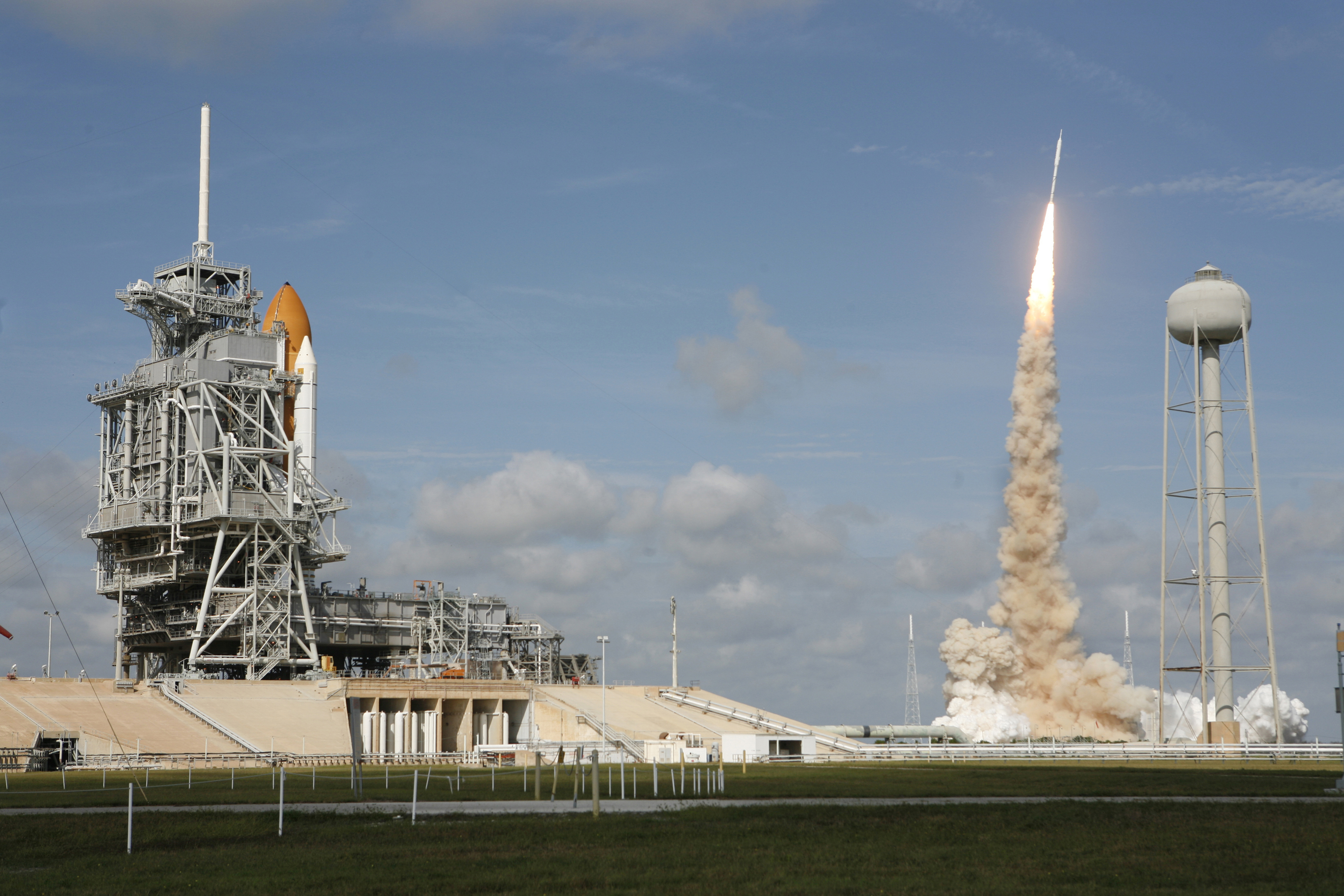
The Ares I-X test rocket lifts off from pad 39B while Atlantis waits to launch on STS 129 from pad 39A.

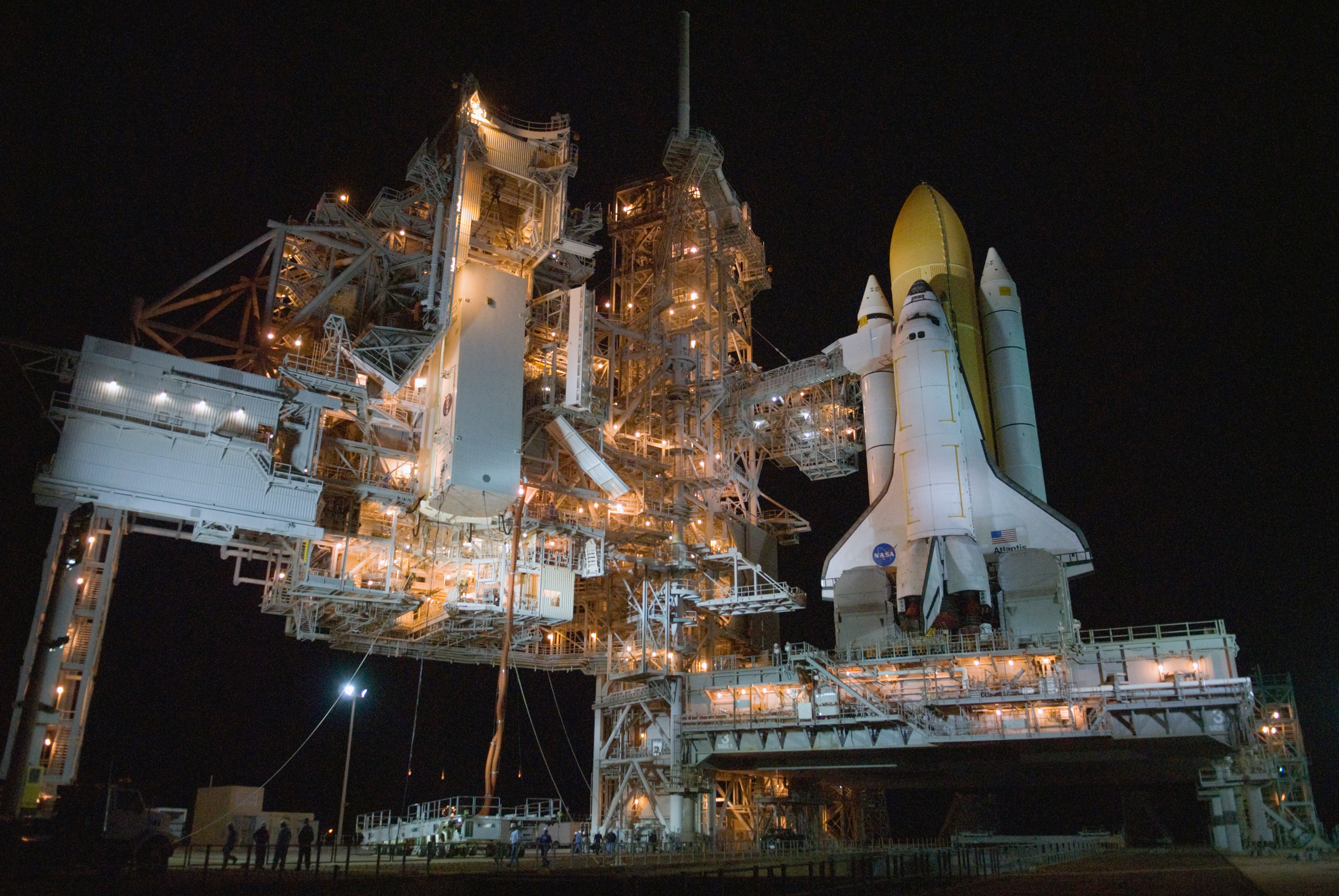
The canister containing STS-129 payload at pad 39A awaiting installation into Atlantis' payload bay

Atlantis was towed from its hangar in Orbiter Processing Facility-1 to the Vehicle Assembly Building (VAB) on October 6, 2009, at about 07:00 EDT. The move, known as rollover, was completed at 08:25 when Atlantis arrived in the VAB transfer aisle. Atlantis was initially scheduled to roll out to Launch Pad 39A on October 13, 2009. However, an issue with a crane that was being used to transfer Atlantis for attachment to its external fuel tank and two solid rocket boosters caused a delay in operations forcing the shuttle managers to add extra 24-hours to the rollout preparations.

Atlantis rolled out from the VAB to the Launch Complex 39A on October 14, 2009, at 06:38 EDT in a slow drive on the top of the Crawler-transporter. The 3.4 miles (5.5 km) rollout was completed with the launch platform secured in place at about 13:31 EDT.

The final flight readiness review (FRR) meeting for the STS-129 mission took place at Kennedy Space Center during the last week of October 2009. The FRR had approved the installation of a special minicam pointing out of window 4 on Atlantis' flight deck. The camera will film the forward portion of the External Tank during the shuttle's ascent to orbit, in order to capture the behavior of the LO2 Ice Frost Ramps (IFRs) located on the upper part of the tank during potential liberation events.

NASA managers held a post news conference to brief about the outcomes of the FRR on October 30, 2009. The briefing was broadcast on NASA TV and was attended by William Gerstenmaier, NASA's Associate Administrator for Space Operations, Michael Moses, Launch Integration Manager, Space Shuttle Program and Michael Leinbach, Space Shuttle launch director. Mr. Gerstenmaier and Mr. Moses mentioned about two issues related to ongoing shuttle processing that had been discussed during the FRR: (1) Effects of vibrations and acoustics associated with the Main Engine ignition—a potential issue with a stinger (bolt) structure on the aft of the shuttle, which may be susceptible to the stresses of Main Engine ignition (2) Shuttle's toilet – a new Aluminum bracket used to help anchor the toilet to the crew module structure had been installed. For future flights, NASA plans to use a redesigned Titanium bracket.

The payload for the mission was moved to Launch Pad 39A on the October 29, 2009, and was installed into the shuttle's payload bay on November 4, 2009.

During the post-flight interview on November 16, shuttle launch director Mike Leinbach told that Atlantis officially beat shuttle Discovery on the record low amount of Interim Problem Reports, with a total of just 54 listed since returning from the STS-125. He continued to add "It's due to the team and the hardware processing. They just did a great job. The record will probably never be broken again in the history of the Space Shuttle Program, so congratulations to them".

=== Launch preparations ===
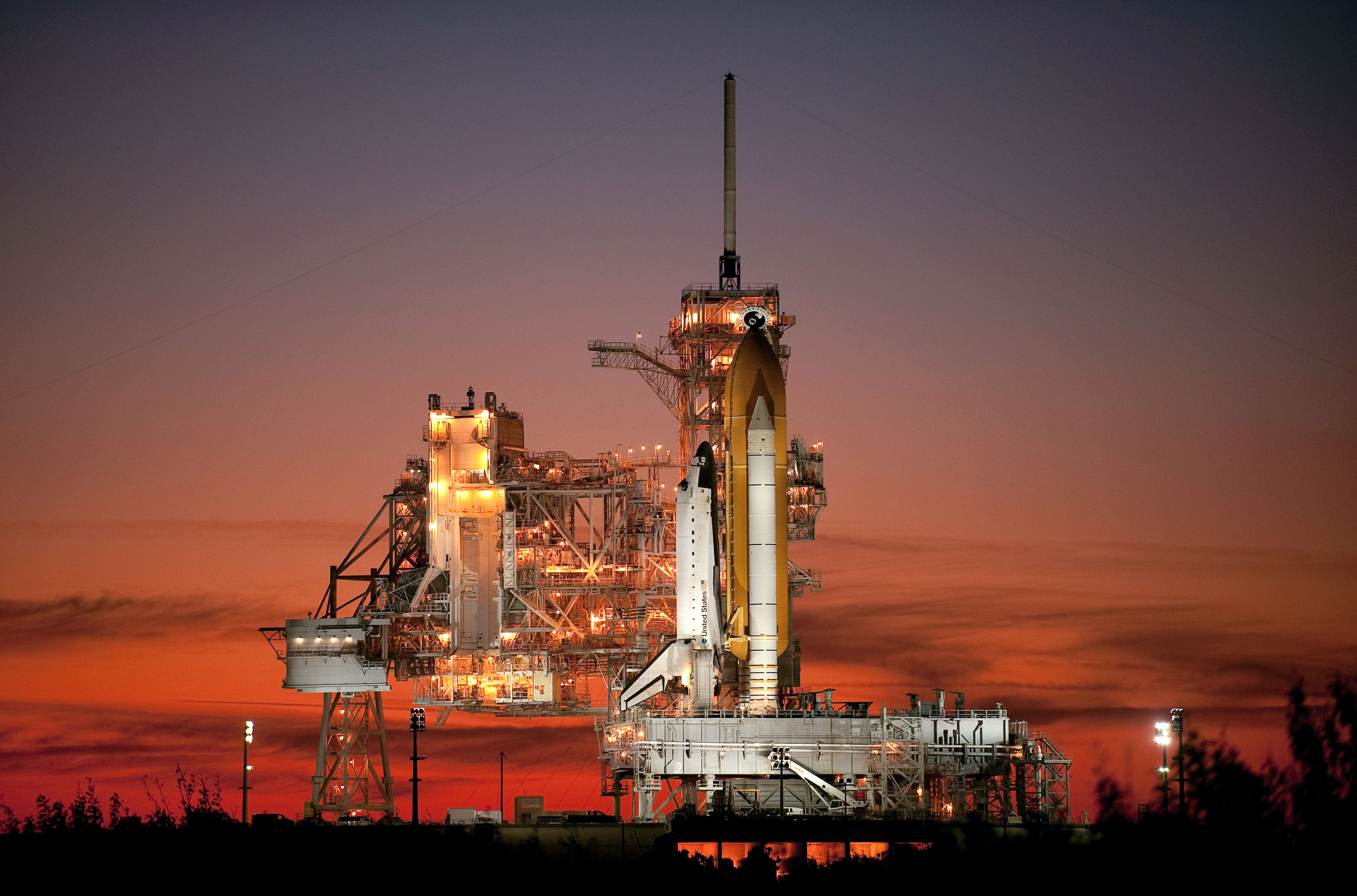
The Space Shuttle Atlantis is seen on launch pad 39A at the NASA Kennedy Space Center shortly after the rotating service structure was rolled back on November 15, 2009.

Final launch preparations commenced at Pad 39A with technicians closing Atlantis' payload bay doors during the morning hours on November 13, 2009. On the same day, NASA's official launch countdown clock began at 1 pm and the crew flew to Kennedy's Shuttle Landing Facility in a Shuttle Training Aircraft Gulfstream II jet at 12:35 EST to prepare for the launch.

On November 14, 2009, after the L-2 Mission Management Team (MMT) meeting, Space Shuttle launch integration manager Michael Moses announced that the MMT gave the official "go" for Atlantis's launch on Monday, and Hobaugh and Wilmore practiced landings in the Shuttle Training Aircraft. On the evening at about 5.30 pm the Rotating Service Structure that protects the shuttle from adverse weather conditions was rolled back anticipating next day's launch.

The MMT again met at 04:30 EST on November 16, 2009, and gave a "go" to begin loading shuttle Atlantis' external tank. The tanking began at 05:03 EST and was completed at 08:00 EST. The final unanimous "go" for launch directive from the mission management team, mission control and the launch team came during the countdown clock holding at T-9 minutes.

The initial launch day weather forecast called for a 90% chance of favorable launch conditions. As the launch preparations continued, due to lower cloud cover ceilings it was changed to 70% and at liftoff to 80%.

== Mission timeline ==
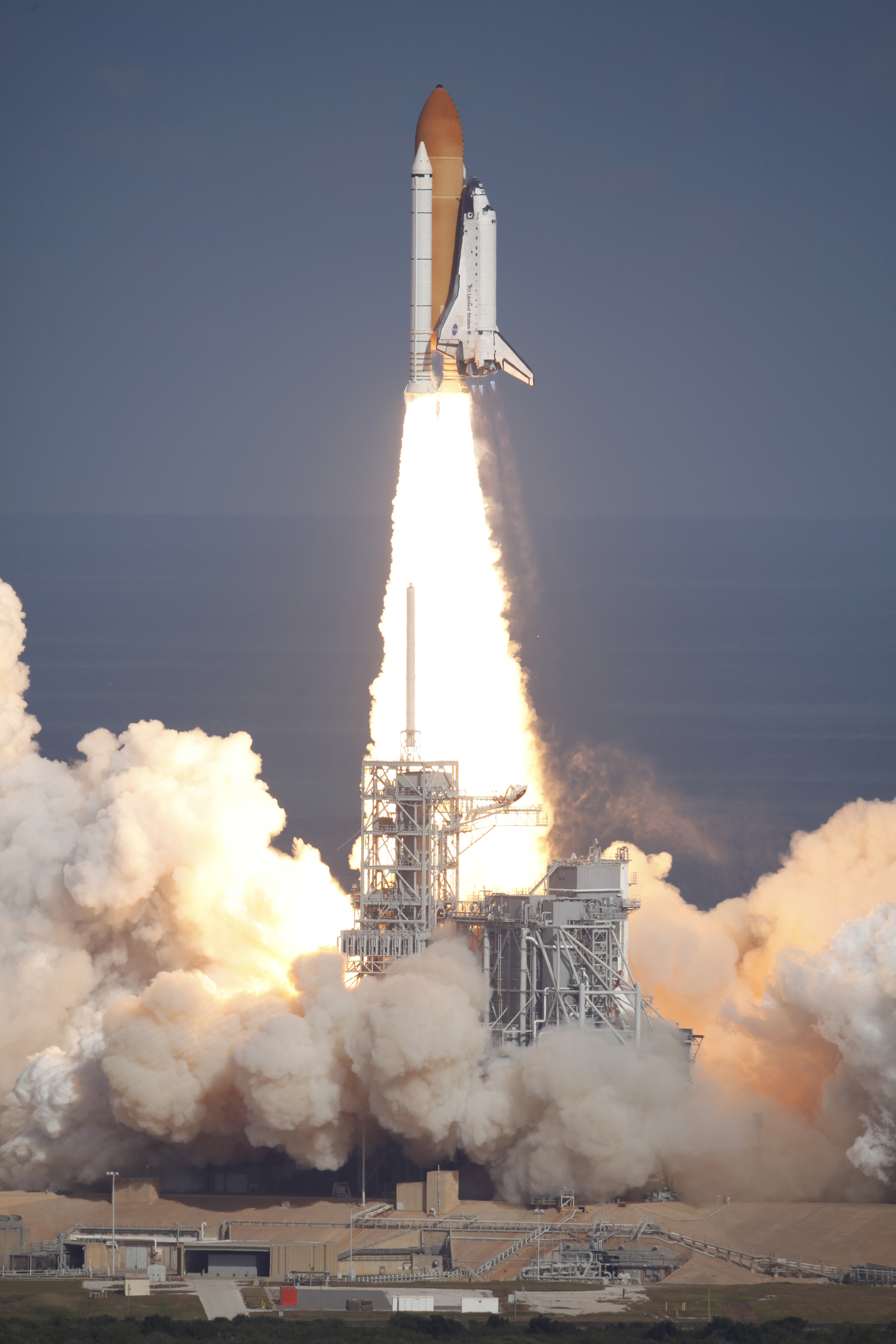
Space Shuttle Atlantis launches from Kennedy Space Center, November 16, 2009.

=== November 16 (Flight Day 1 – Launch) ===
Launch video (11 mins 31 secs)

Atlantis launched on time at 14:28 EDT (19:28:10 UTC), with launch commentator George Diller's words upon launch being "liftoff of space shuttle Atlantis, on a mission to build, re-supply and to do research on the International Space Station". Powered flight conformed to the standard timeline (see Space Shuttle – Mission Profile – Launch), with main engine cutoff (MECO) occurring at eight minutes and 24 seconds Mission Elapsed Time (MET) and the external tank separating from the shuttle at eight minutes and 38 seconds MET into the flight. A further boost from the Orbital Maneuvering System (OMS) engines was not required due to the nominal MECO and Atlantis settled into its planned preliminary orbit. A subsequent NC-1 engine firing adjusted the orbital path of the shuttle to the ISS, by altering the shuttle's velocity, resulting in a new orbit of 147 by 118 statute miles.

At the post-launch news conference, NASA officials reported that three foam events were seen in the external fuel tank (ET) video camera footage. They further quoted that the events weren't a concern since the foam loss events occurred after the aerodynamic sensitive time period. Later in the day, based on a quick-look review of the launch video, crew communicator (CAPCOM) astronaut Christopher Ferguson also informed the shuttle crew that there were no ascent debris events of concern.

Flight day 1 on-orbit operations included, opening of both payload bay doors of Atlantis at 21:12 GMT, deploying the radiators, deploying Ku-Band antenna to gain favorable communications, opening of the protective doors covering the star trackers on the nose of the shuttle, setting up the onboard computer network, downlinking imagery and data collected during the flight into orbit, getting out of their launch and entry spacesuits and stowing away the mission specialists' seats.

The crew also completed a thorough checkout of the shuttle's robotic arm earlier in preparation for the survey of Atlantis' wing leading edge panels and nose cap on flight day 2. Some of the crew started their sleep period around 21:45 pm EST about an hour or so later than originally planned.

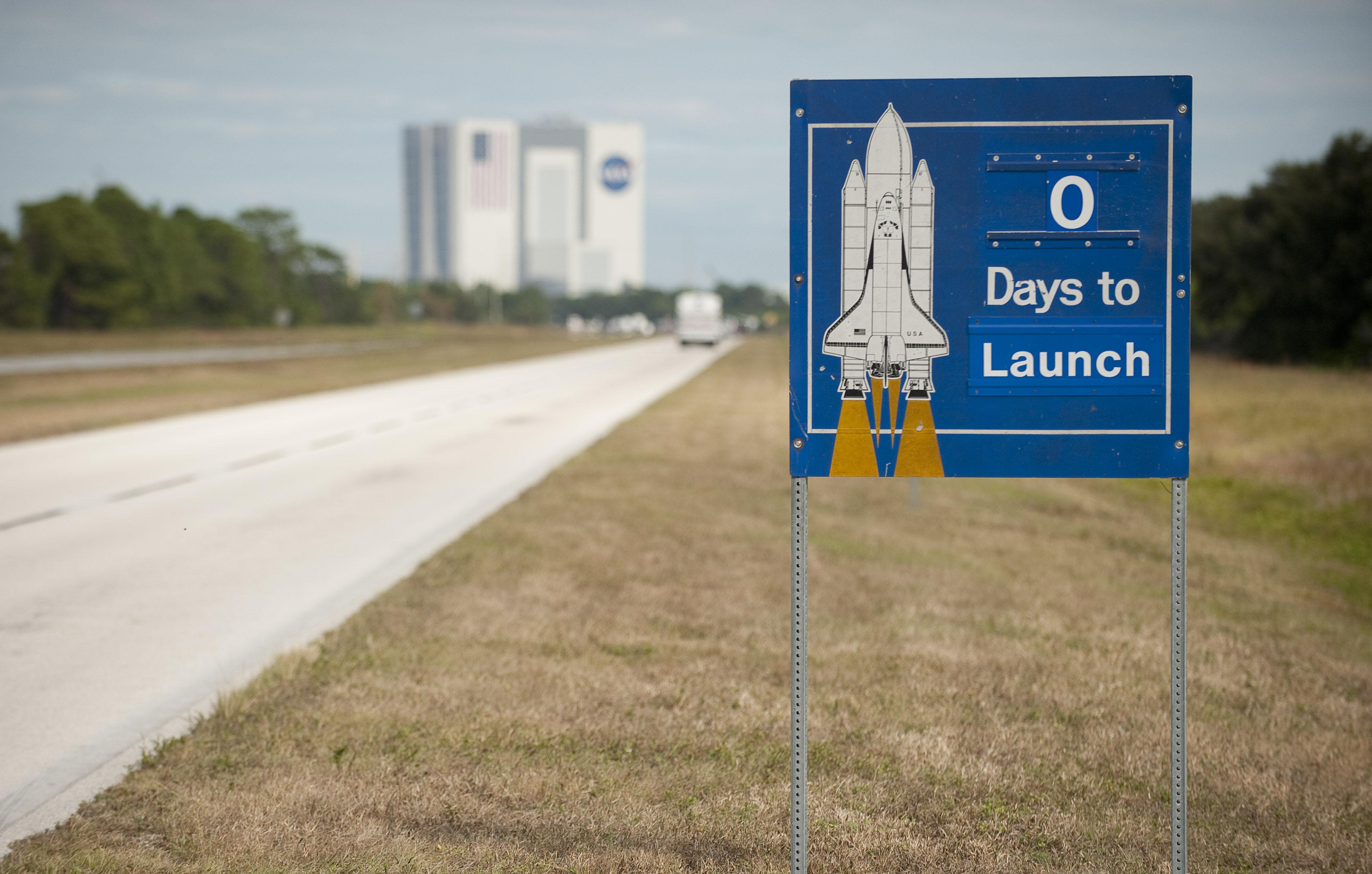
STS-129 launch countdown sign

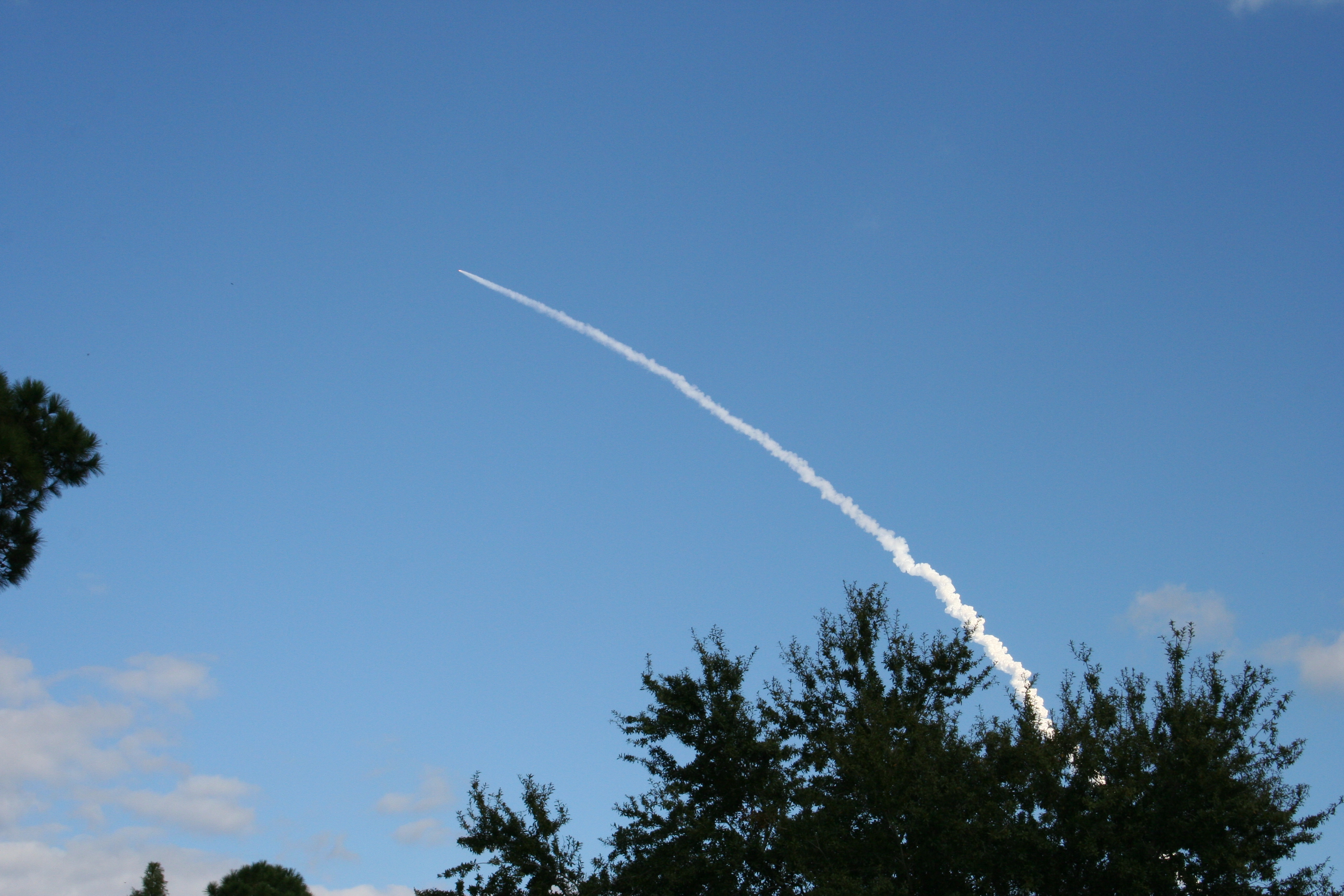
STS-129 launch viewed from east Orlando

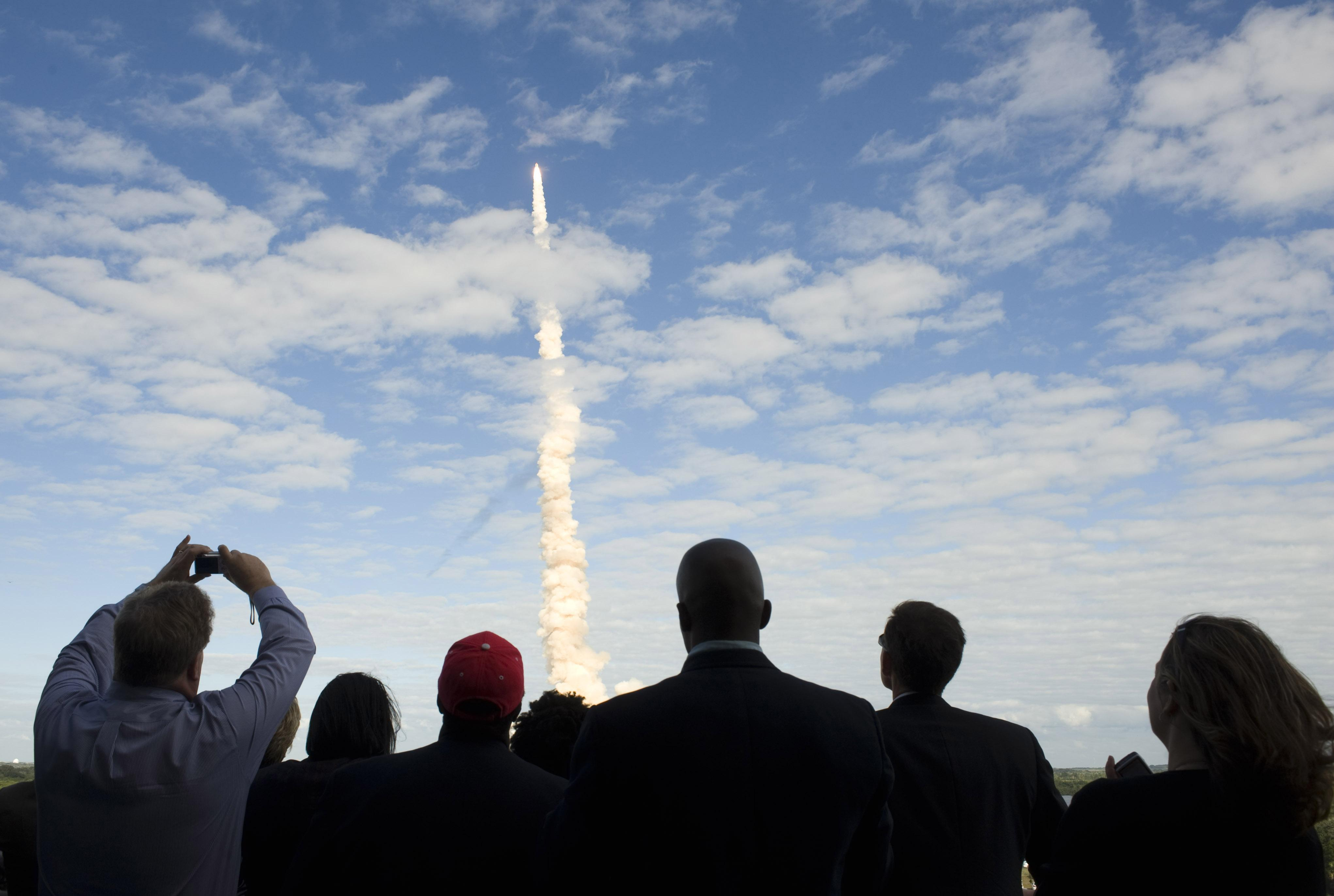
Guests at the KSC view the launch.

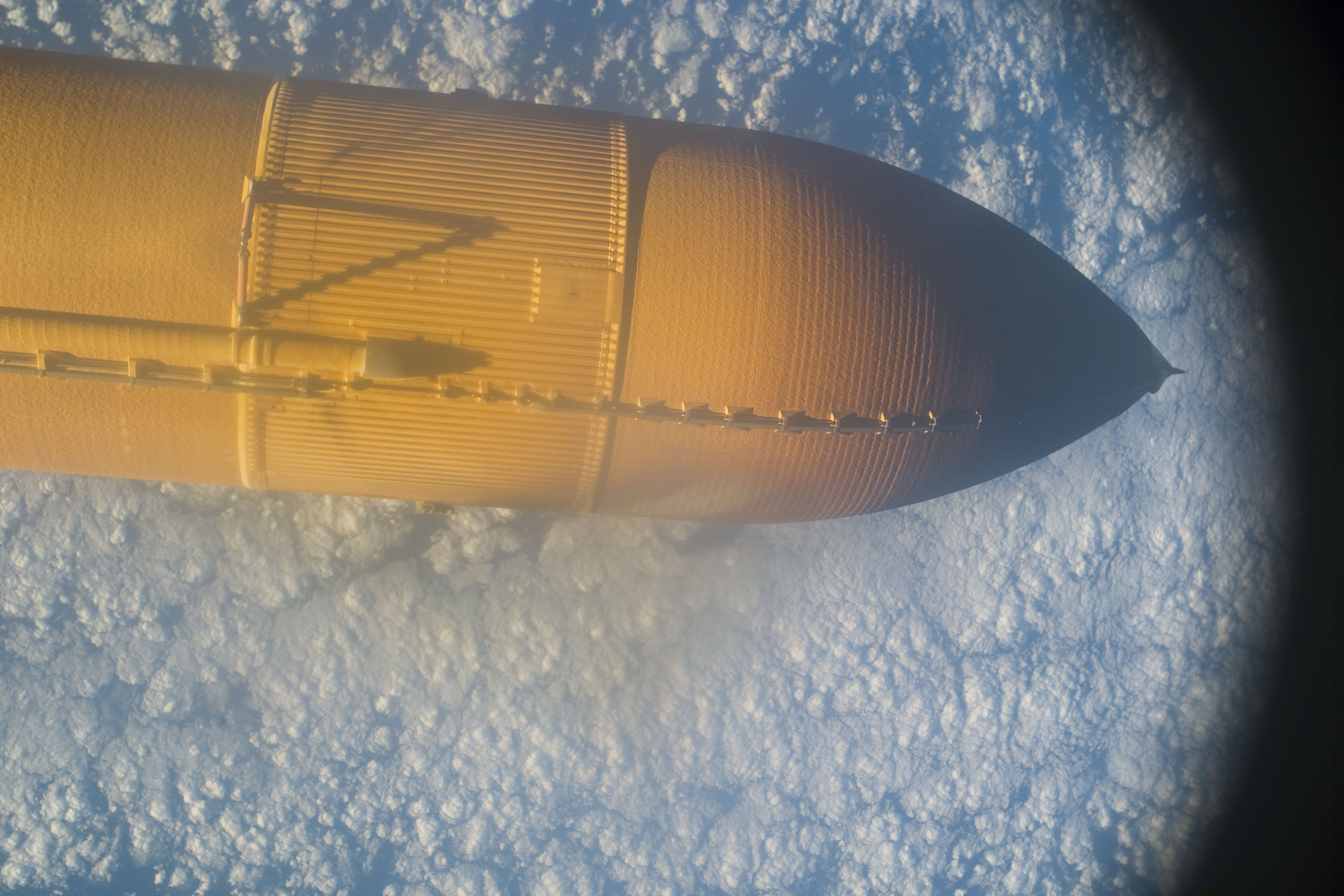
Backdropped by a blanket of clouds, ET after separating from the shuttle.

=== November 17 (Flight Day 2 – TPS survey) ===
The crew members aboard space shuttle Atlantis began their first full day in space at 09:28 UTC. The day was primarily devoted to inspect Atlantis's thermal protection system to look for any signs of launch damage. Using the shuttle's robotic arm and the Orbiter Boom Sensor System (OBSS), the crew performed a six-hour inspection of the reinforced carbon nose cap and wing leading edge panels of the shuttle. After releasing its grasp on the inspection boom, the robotic arm grappled the ExPRESS Logistics Carrier 1 (ELC1) as a preparatory step for installation on Flight Day 3.

The images and video from the thermal protection system survey would be reviewed by the image analysis team on the ground. During the day's Mission Management Team (MMT) briefing, chairman LeRoy Cain noted that a preliminary assessment of ascent imagery and data beamed down during the thermal protection inspection showed no signs of any significant heat shield damage.

The crew also made progress to dock with the space station on Flight Day 3. The mission's spacewalkers worked inside the middeck to test and ready the spacesuits that would be used during the spacewalks. The crew extended the ring of the orbital docking system in preparation for linkup with the ISS. Commander Charles Hobaugh also installed the docking system's centerline camera that was used during the rendezvous with the station in the docking port. Two Rendezvous burns were performed (NC-2 and NC-3) on the path to reach the station. The NC-2 burn was scheduled for earlier in the day and once again Atlantis' reaction control jets were fired for NC-3 burn later in the day. The NC-3 burn lasted for 12s.

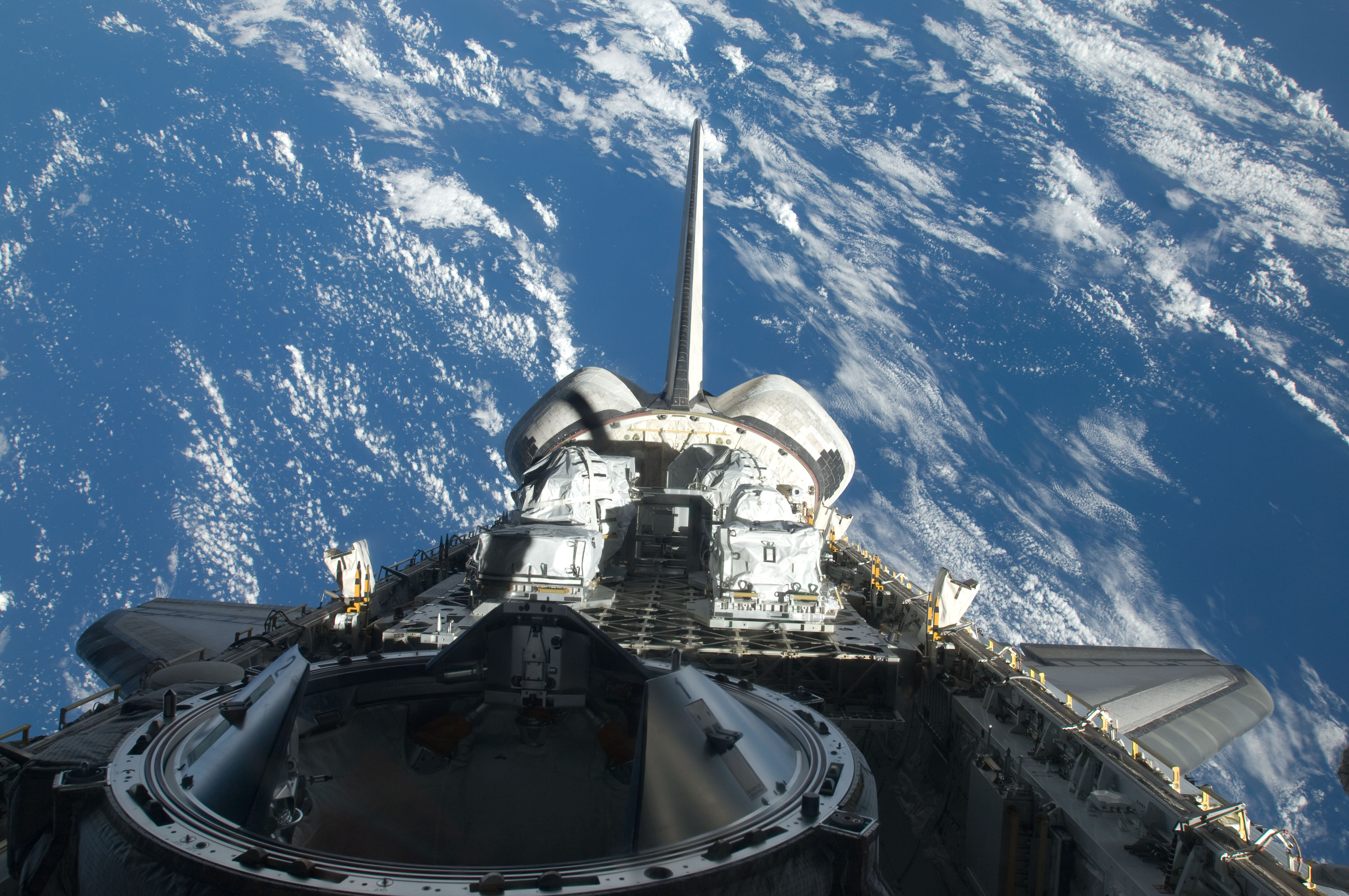
Atlantis' payload bay, vertical stabilizer, OMS pods and docking mechanism

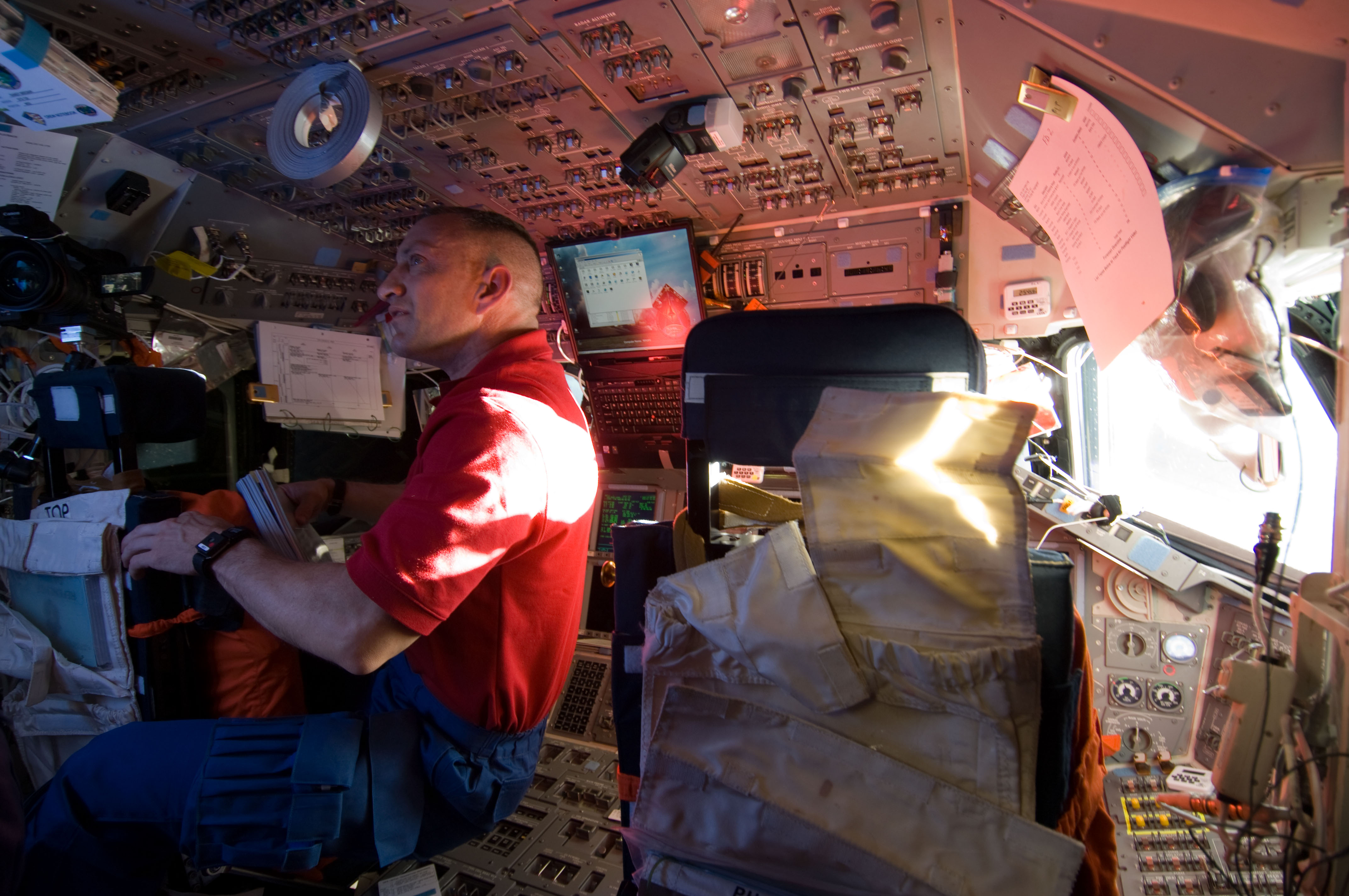
STS-129 Commander Charles Hobaugh on the flight-deck during flight day 2 activities

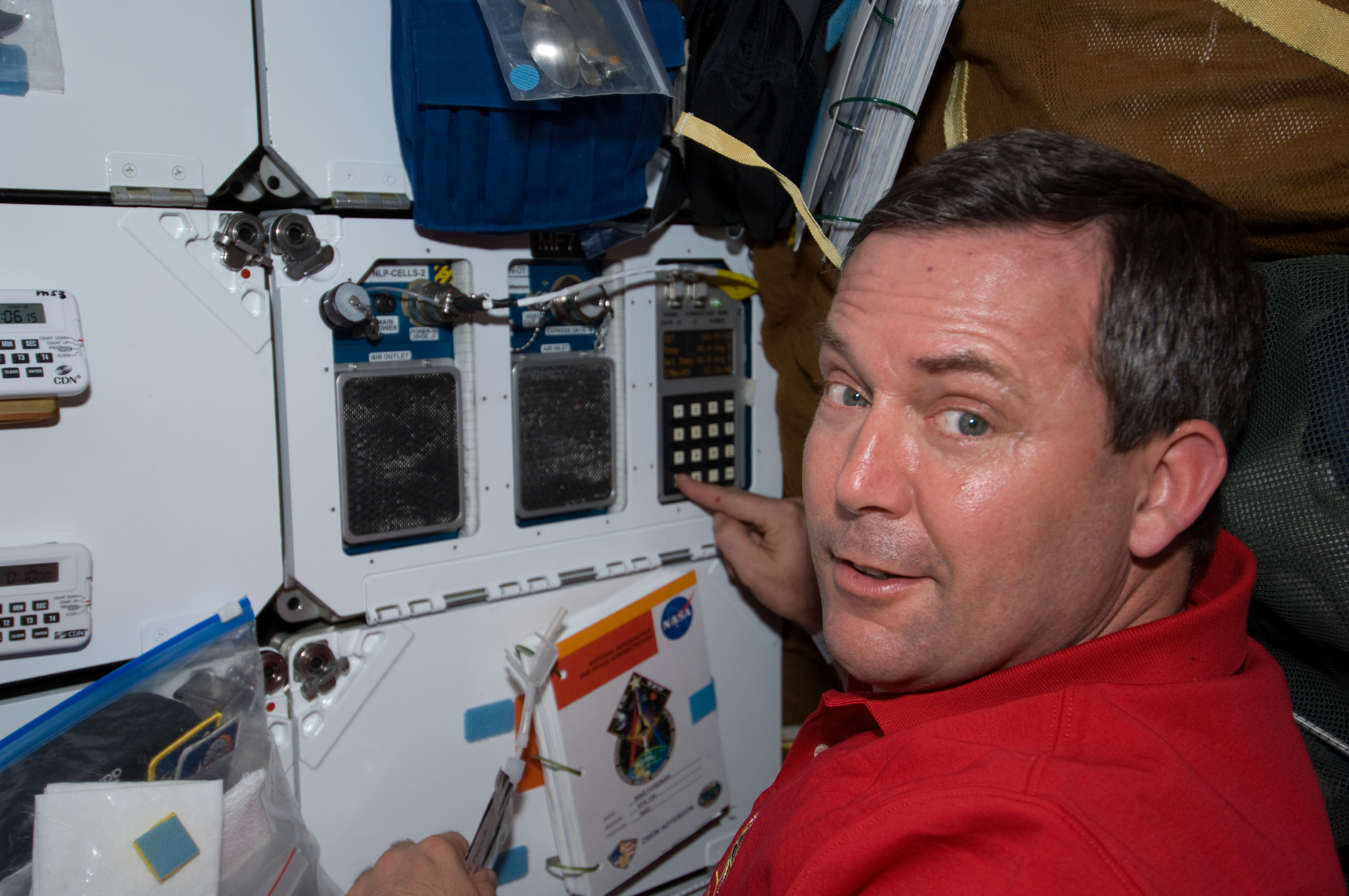
Mission Specialist Michael Foreman on the mid-deck of Atlantis

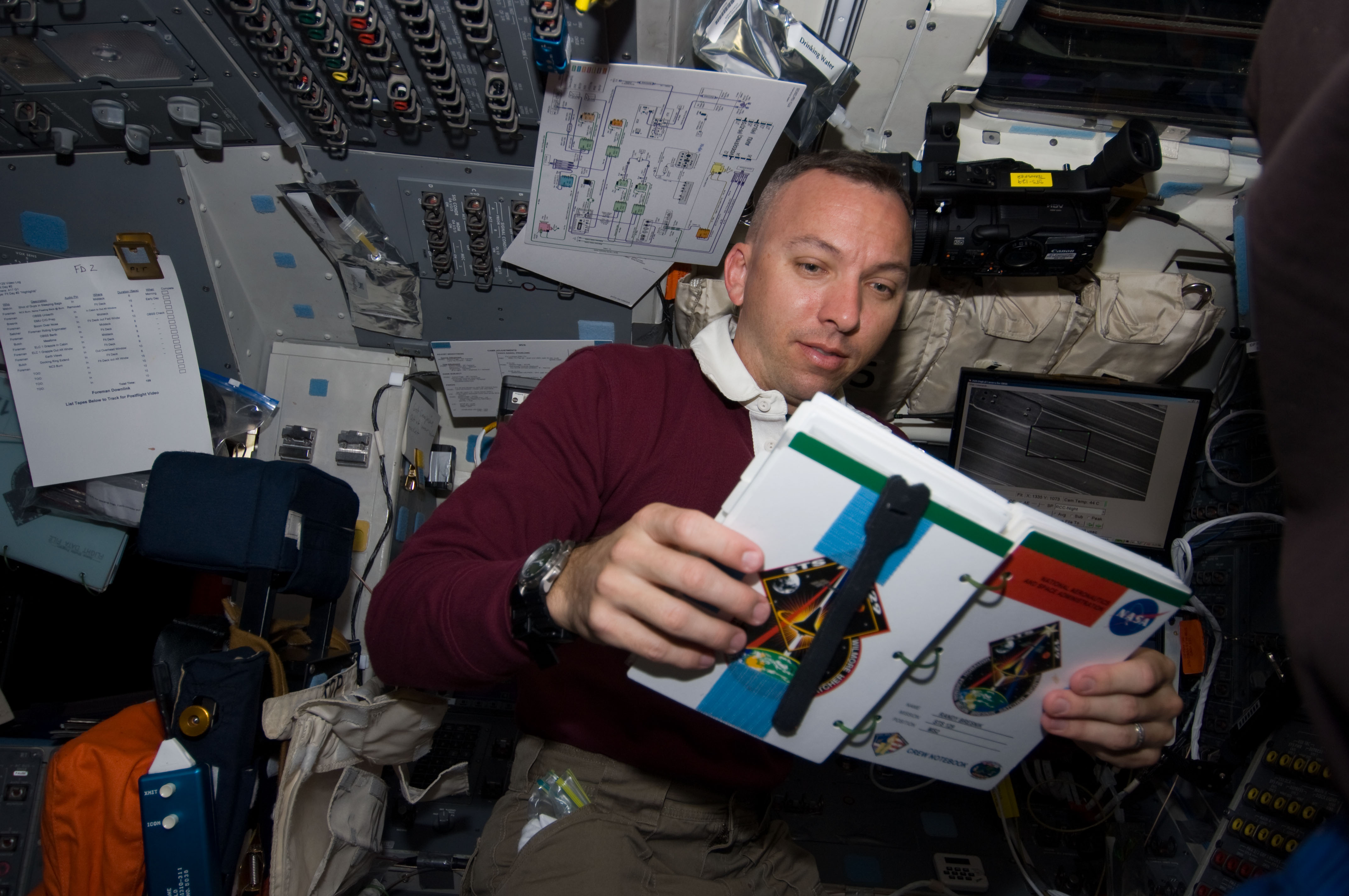
Mission Specialist Randolph Bresnik reading his crew notebook on the aft flight deck

=== November 18 (Flight Day 3 – Docking) ===
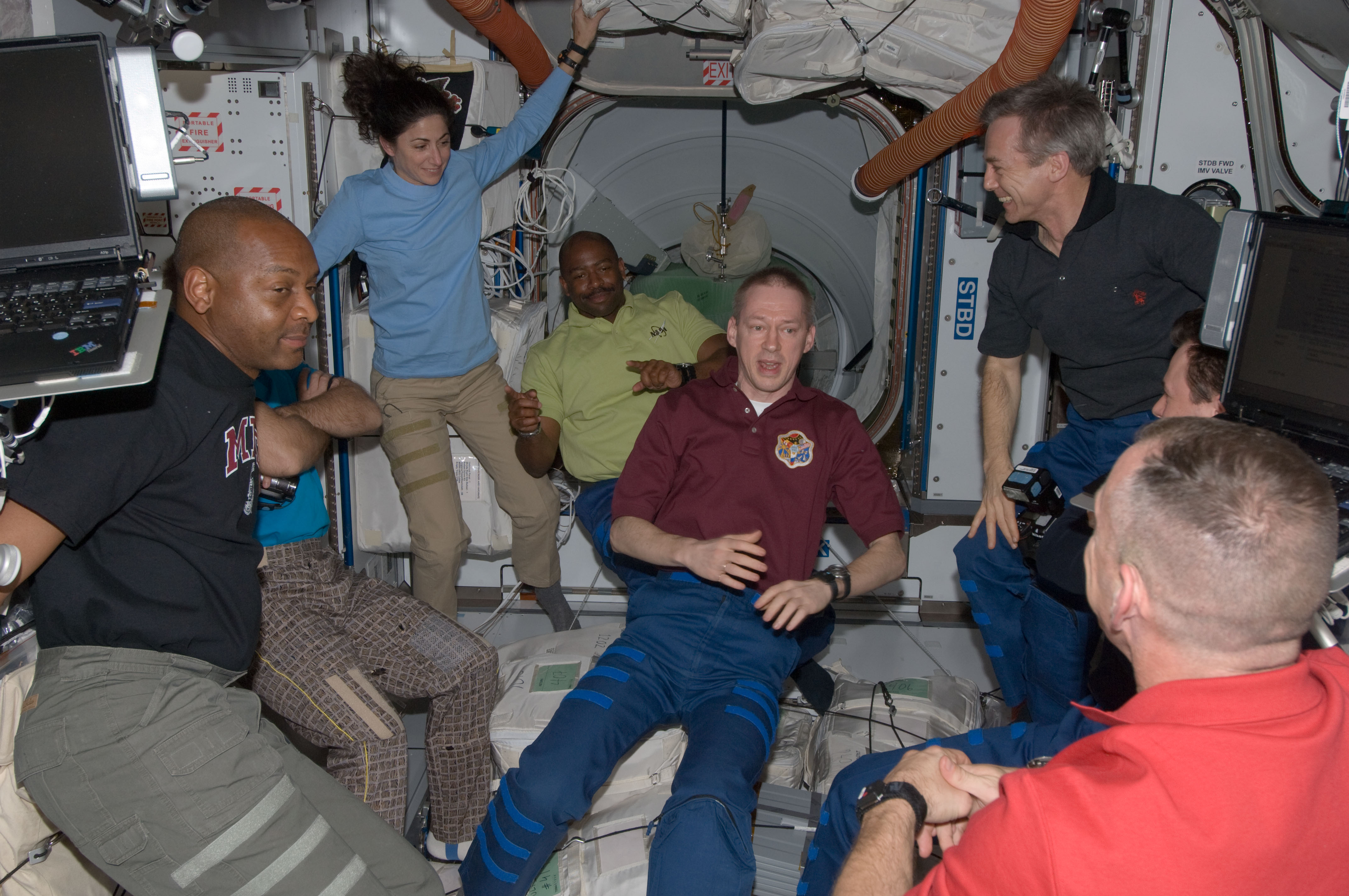
STS-129 and ISS crew pictured shortly after the hatch opening

Atlantis' crew awoke at 09:28 UTC and began the rendezvous operations two hours into the day. Guided by a series of maneuvers—NH, NC-4 and the Terminal Insertion burns to refine the shuttle's trajectory—Atlantis closed in on the space station. Before the shuttle docked STS-129 Commander Charles Hobaugh performed what is known as the Rendezvous Pitch Maneuver (RPM) beginning at 15:52 UTC above the Atlantic Ocean, while Station astronauts Nicole Stott and Jeffrey Williams photographed Atlantis' underside with handheld digital cameras equipped with 400- and 800-millimeter lenses as part of post-launch inspections of the heat shield. The photos were down-linked to mission control for review. The pitch maneuver was completed at 16:01 UTC.

Docking to Harmony/Pressurized Mating Adapter-2 occurred a couple of minutes ahead of schedule at 16:51 UTC. The joined spacecraft were orbiting 220 miles above Earth at the time of docking, above Australia and Tasmania. After leak checks, the hatchway between Atlantis and the space station was opened at 18:28 UTC. The traditional welcome ceremony and the station safety briefing followed, and shuttle and station crews began their joint operations for the rest of day. The astronauts worked to move the spacewalking suits carried up on Atlantis over to the Quest airlock for use in the EVAs. After the hatch opening, astronaut Nicole Stott's tenure as a station Expedition 21 flight engineer came to an end as she joined the Atlantis crew.

Later in the day at 19:52 UTC, shuttle's robotic arm operated by Mission Specialists Melvin and Bresnik lifted the ExPRESS Logistics Carrier 1 which it had grappled on Flight day 2 out of the payload bay. After handing over to the station's Canadarm2 controlled by shuttle Pilot Wilmore and station Flight Engineer Williams, the carrier was attached to the ISS's Port 3 truss at 21:27 UTC.

Mission Specialists Michael Foreman and Robert Satcher spent the night in the Quest airlock as part of the overnight "campout" procedure to help them get prepared for next day's spacewalk.

During the post MMT briefing LeRoy Cain noted that the shuttle continues to perform flawlessly with no significant problems to report. Furthermore, he added that NASA is not tracking down any significant issues with Atlantis.

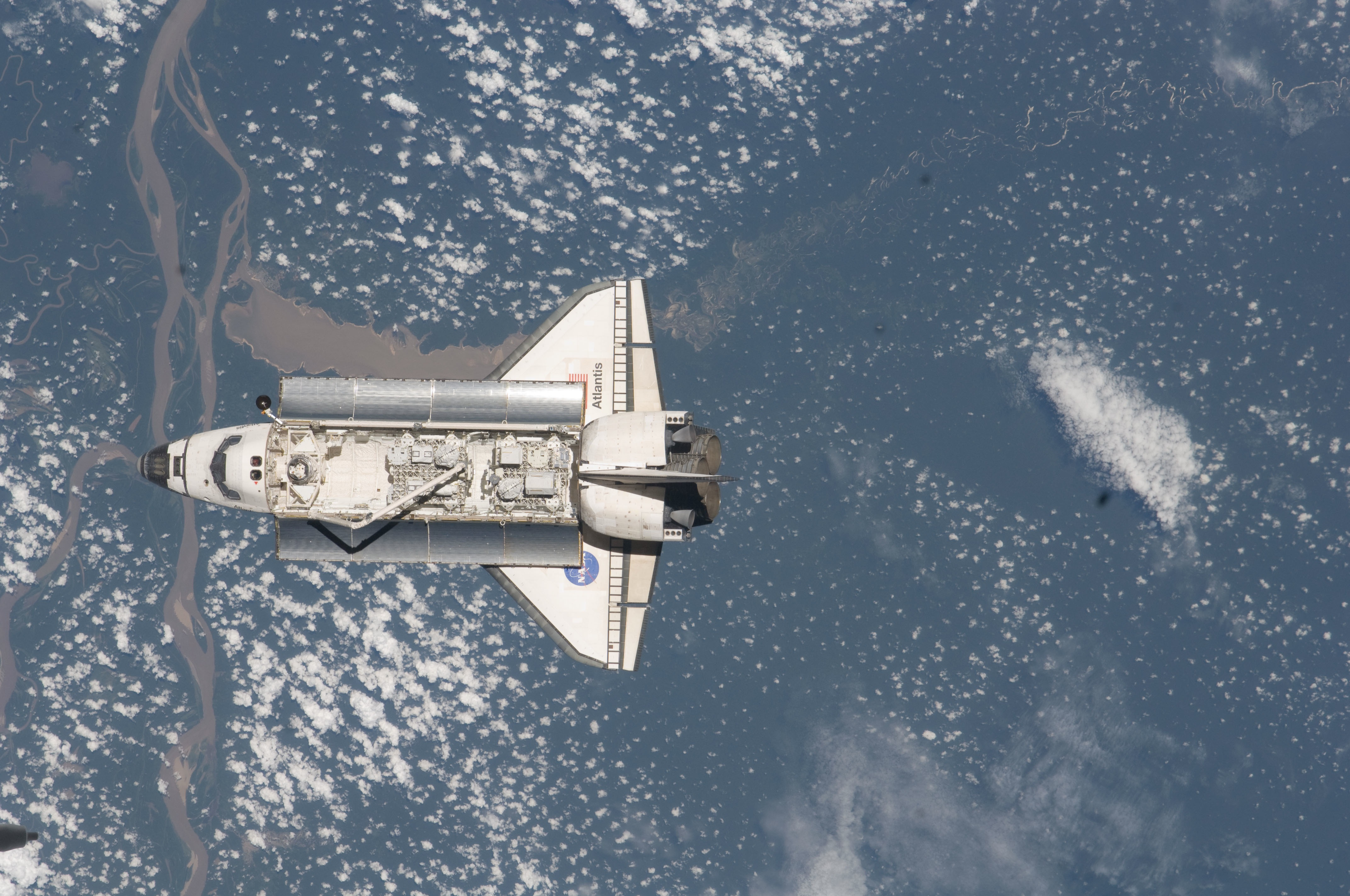
Atlantis photographed by an Expedition 21 crew member

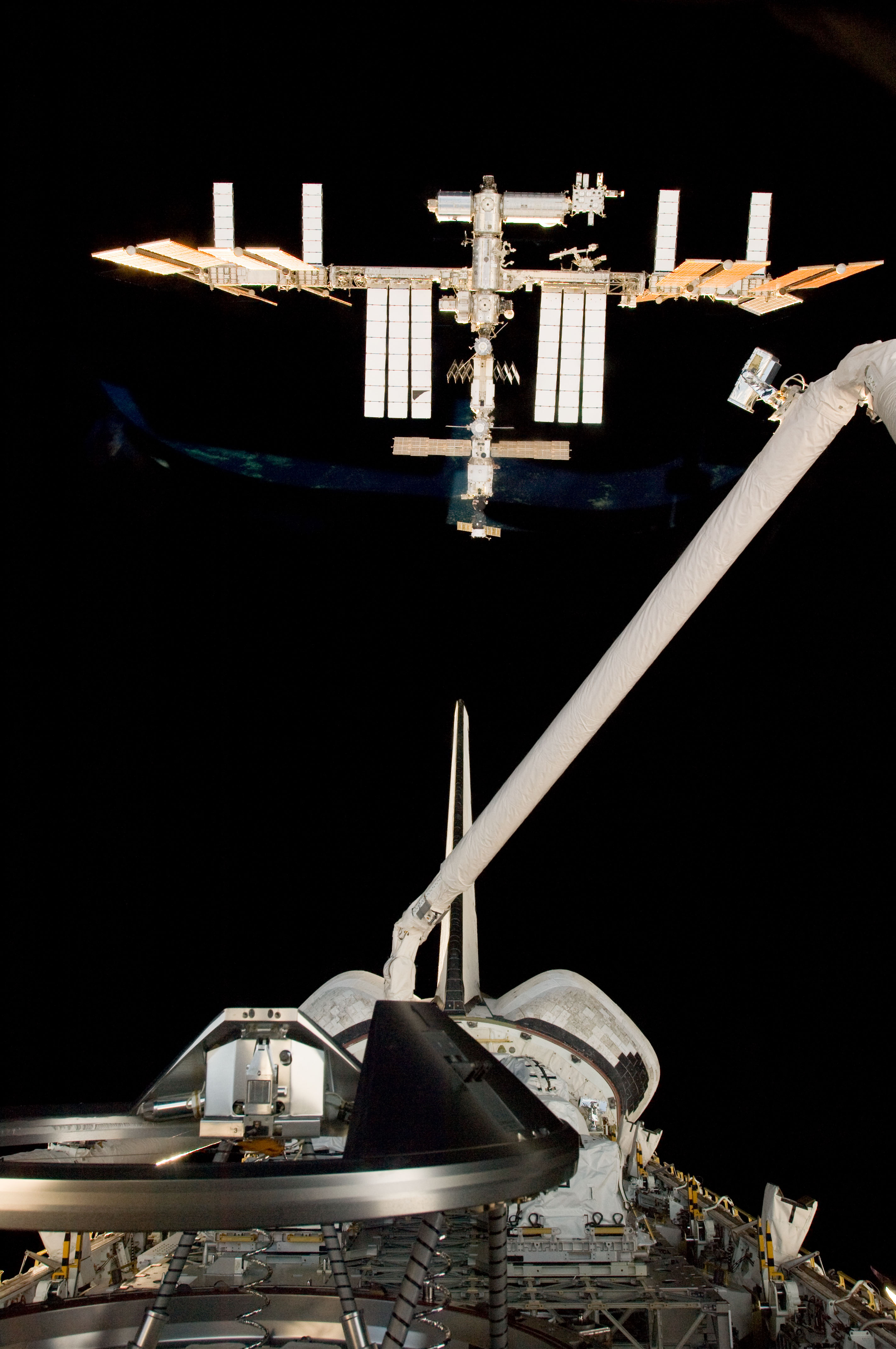
Atlantis and ISS approach each other during rendezvous and docking activities on Flight Day 3

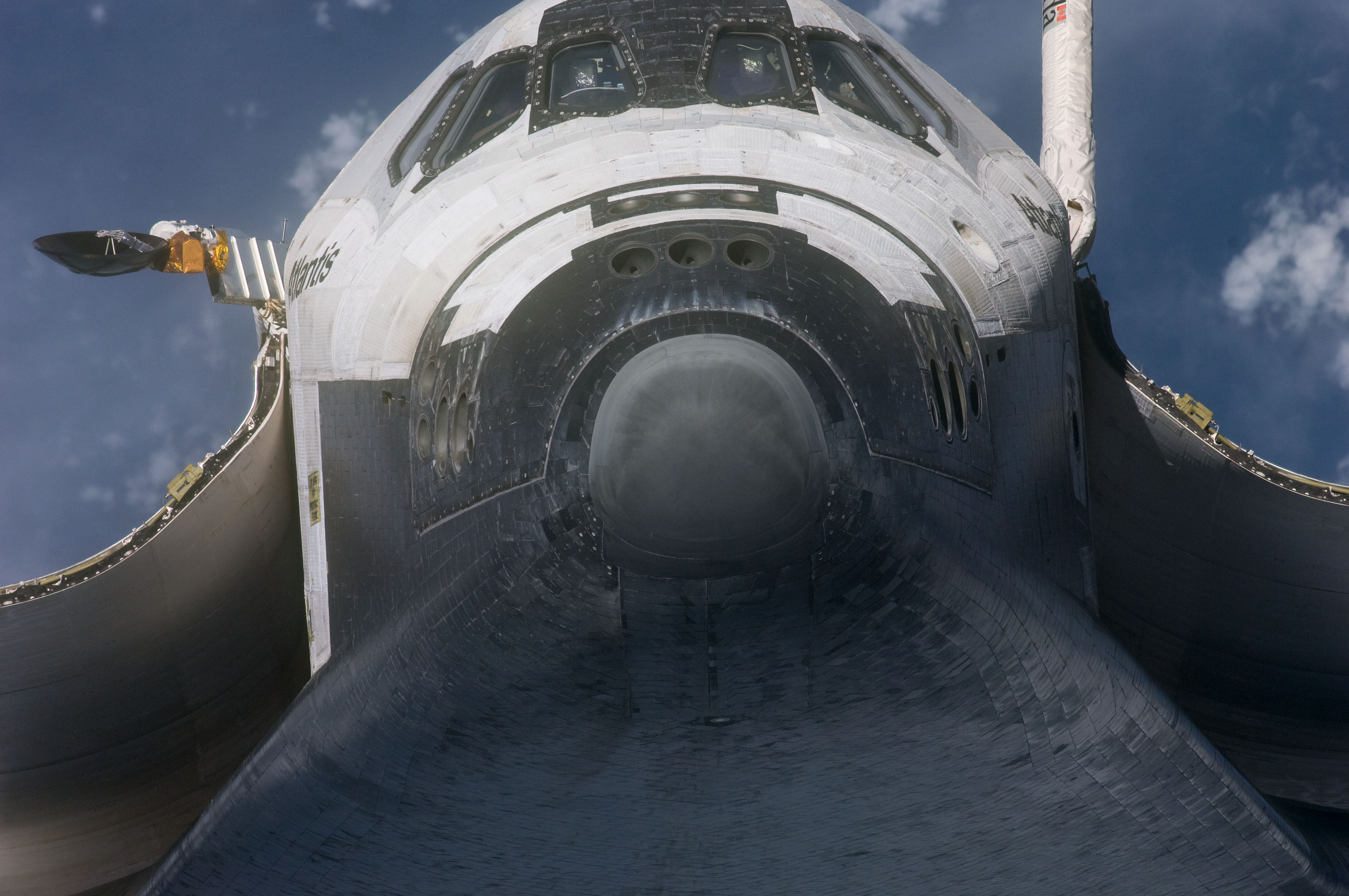
Atlantis performing a back-flip for the rendezvous pitch maneuver

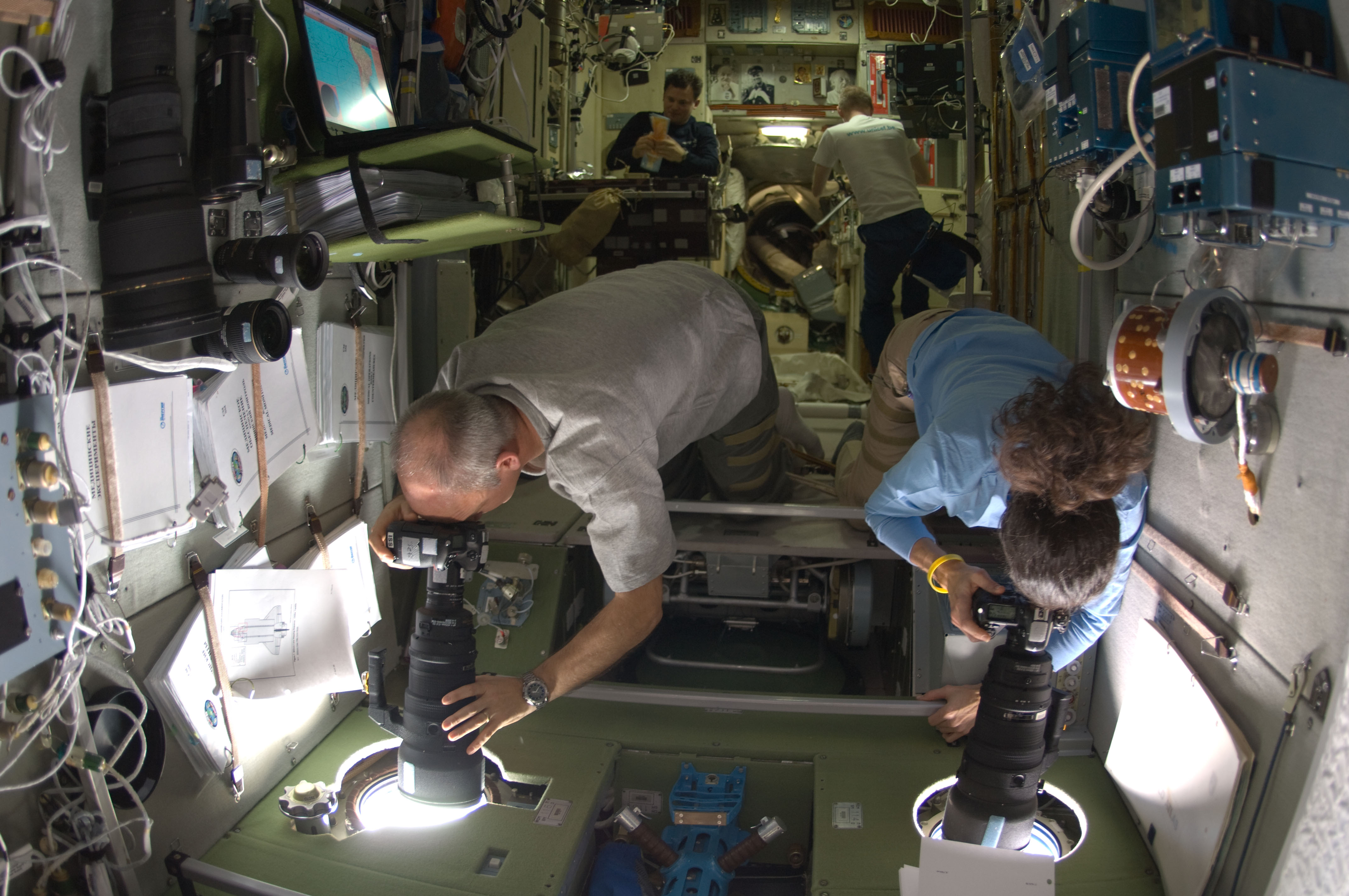
Jeffrey Williams and Nicole Stott photograph Atlantis

=== November 19 (Flight Day 4 – EVA 1) ===
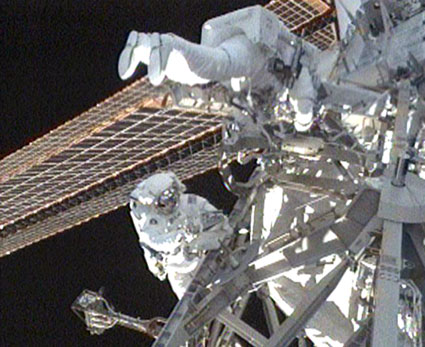
Astronauts Foreman and Satcher work on the exterior of the ISS during EVA 1.

The wakeup call from the Mission Control Center in Houston went up to the crew at 09:28 UTC to begin Flight Day 4. Earlier in the morning, Mission Control also radioed commander Charles Hobaugh with the news that the crew won't need to perform follow-up inspections on Atlantis' heat shield during a period of time set aside on flight day 5. The crew was told to use that "deleted time" to get ahead with shuttle-to-station cargo transfers. Later on Thursday, NASA officials said that Atlantis' heat shield has been cleared for re-entry.

The major activity for the day was mission's first spacewalk (EVA 1) by astronauts Foreman and Satcher. Foreman, the lead spacewalker wore a suit with solid red stripes while Satcher wore an all-white spacesuit. Inside the space station Atlantis Mission Specialist Randolph Bresnik choreographed the activities and coordinated communications between the spacewalkers and Mission Control. Since Foreman and Satcher completed their chores nearly two hours ahead of schedule, planners decided to add a "get ahead" task; Satcher to lubricate the Kibo robotic arm snares while Foreman to route a LAN cable on Zarya and mate power cables on a patch panel at the S0 truss. Towards the end of EVA 1, while deploying the Payload Attach System (PAS) on the Earth-facing side of the Starboard 3 truss, the crew had difficulty loosening a steel bolt and removing a diagonal brace on the PAS. After hammering on a bolt and wiggling the brace, they successfully deployed the PAS and reinstalled the brace. The spacewalk marked: 228th spacewalk conducted by U.S. astronauts, the 134th in support of space station assembly and maintenance, 106th spacewalk out of the space station, the fourth for Foreman and the first for Satcher.

The focus of other Atlantis crew members was mostly on supporting the spacewalk or related activities.

Nicole Stott celebrated her 47th birthday in space.

The astronauts went into their sleep period at 00:28 UTC on November 20, 2009, as planned, however they were awakened at 01:36 UTC due to a false alarm indicating a sudden depressurization. After checks on the ground and in orbit, flight controllers in Houston, Europe and Russia concluded the station was safe and the crews were not in danger. To make up for the sleep they lost reacting to the alarm, crew sleep period was extended by 30 minutes.

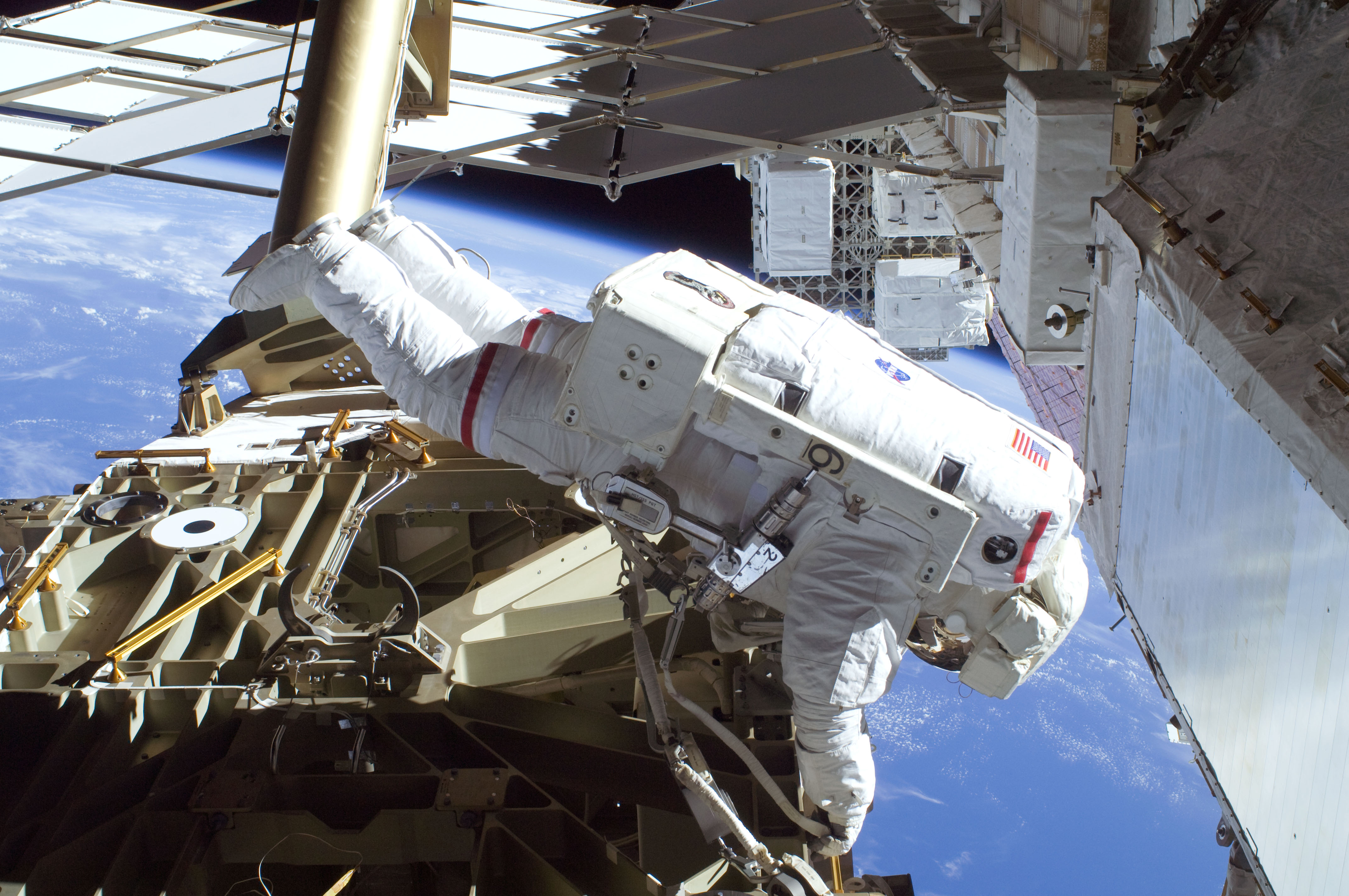
Astronaut Michael Foreman participating in EVA 1

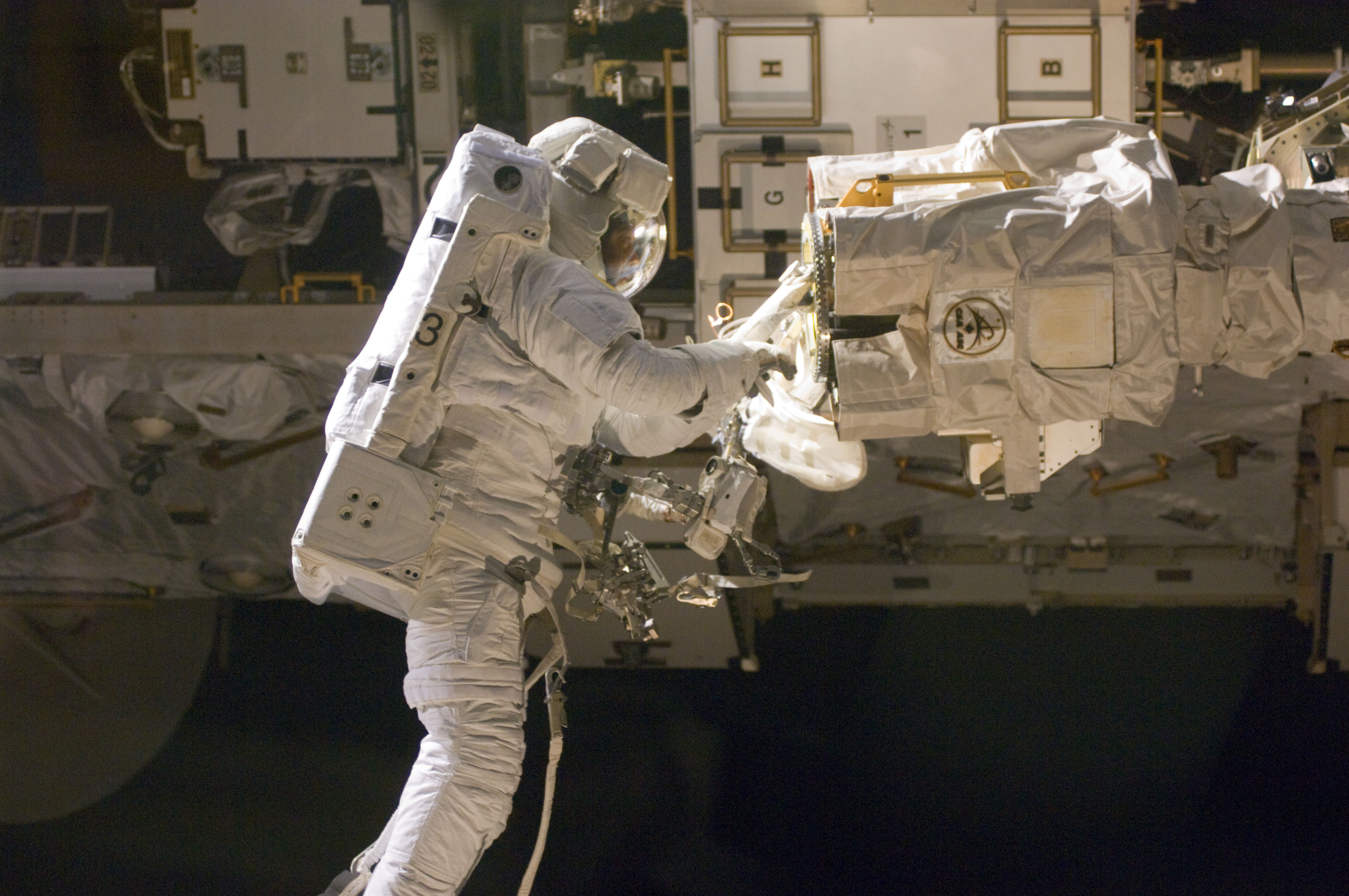
Astronaut Robert Satcher participating in EVA 1

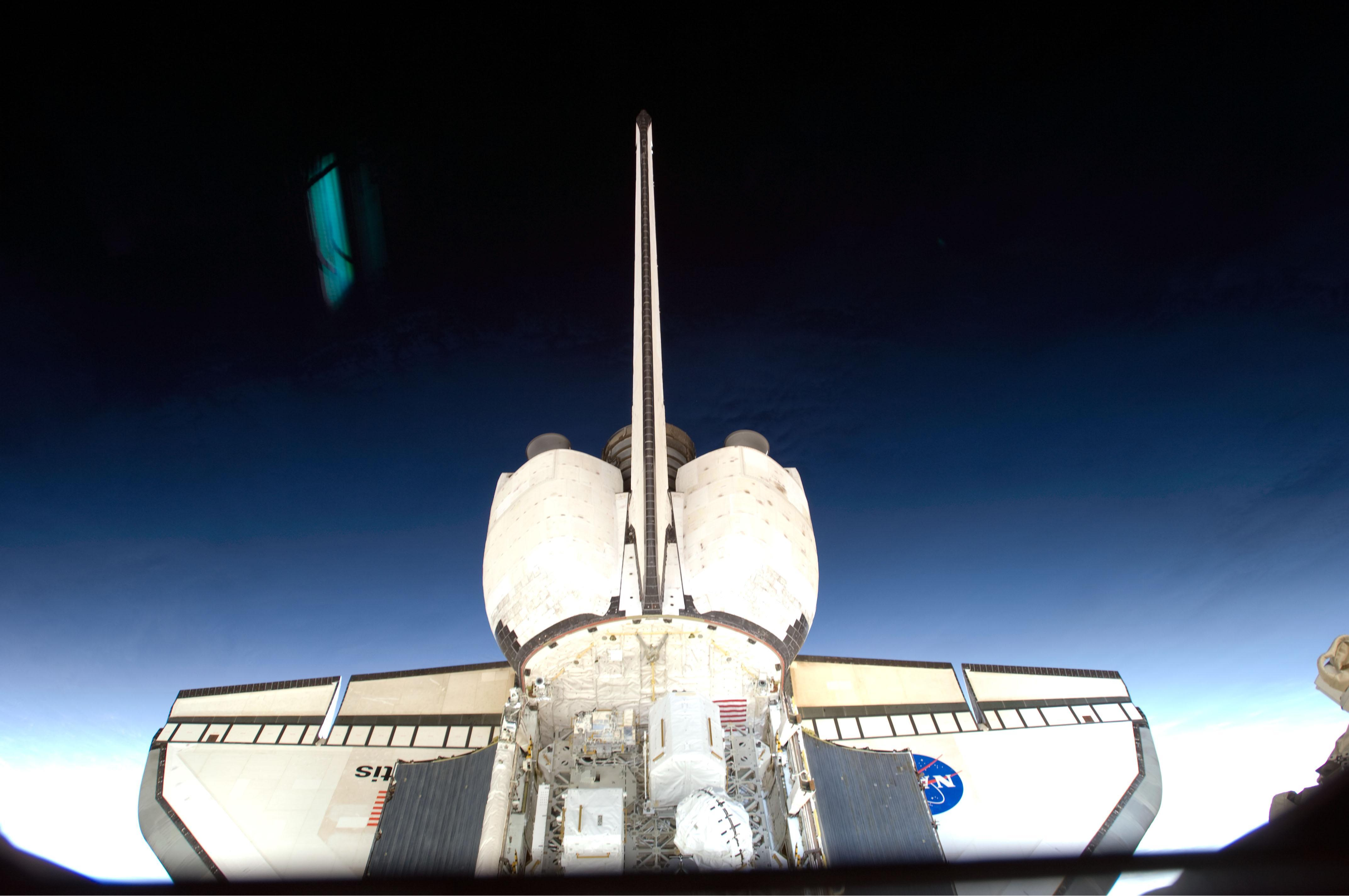
Aft section of Atlantis

=== November 20 (Flight Day 5 – Internal transfers) ===
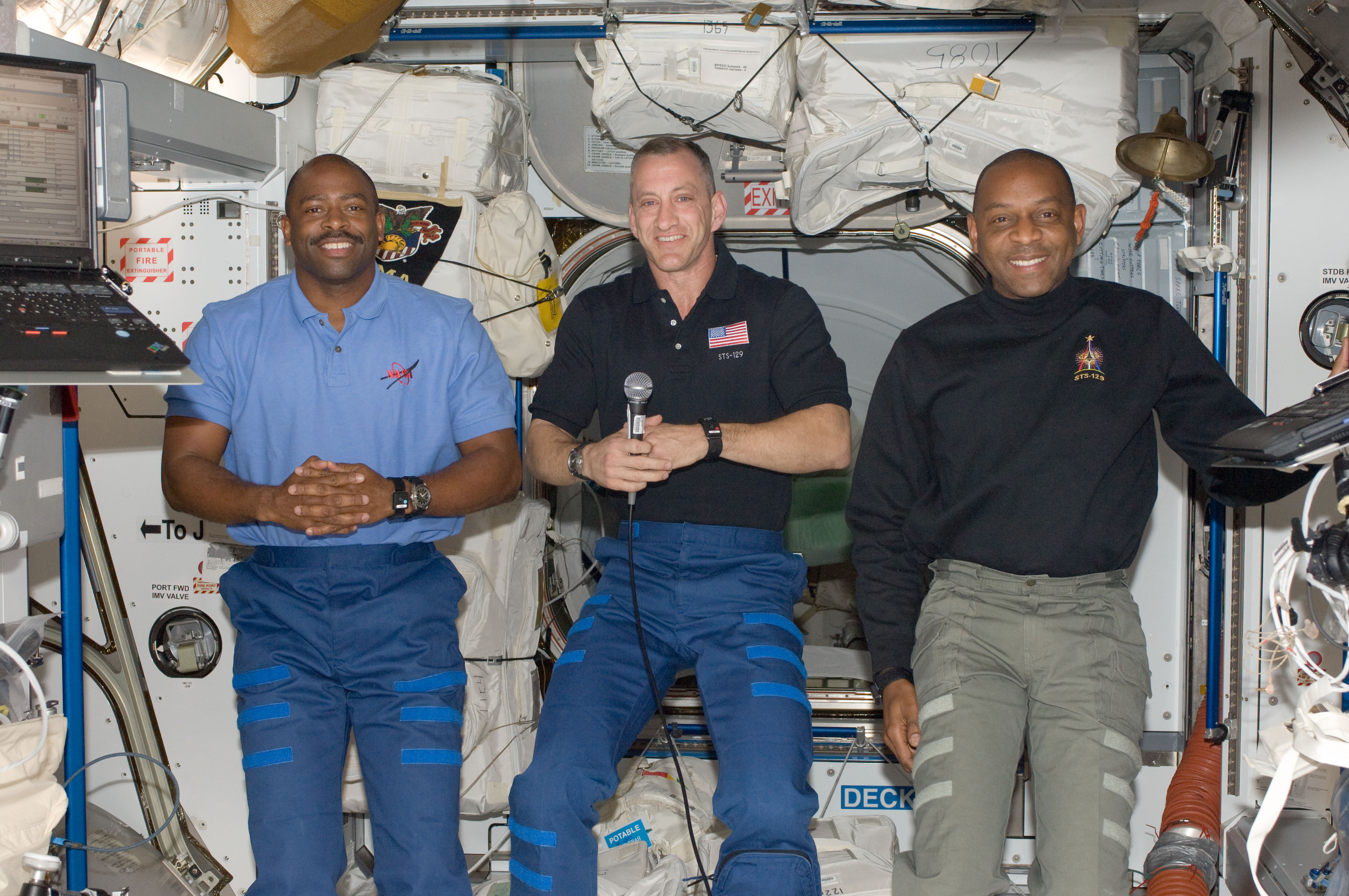
Astronauts Melvin (left), Hobaugh, and Satcher answer media questions.

Atlantis' crew awoke at 09:28 UTC. Just after 12;00 UTC, Atlantis Commander Charles Hobaugh and Mission Specialist Leland Melvin used the shuttle robotic arm to grasp the Express Logistics Carrier (ELC2), located in Atlantis' payload bay.

Internal shuttle-to-station transfer of material kept the crew members busy through flight day 5. As a result, well over half the mission's transfer activities were completed. Inside the station's Unity node, crew members also completed the two-day task of outfitting the node. They routed a slew of cables, hoses and fluid lines to prepare for the arrival of the Tranquility node aboard STS-130, the next scheduled shuttle mission.

Over the course of day, several of the crew participated in chats with media representatives on the ground to answer their questions related to the mission and the experience of being up in space. Shortly after 11:00 UTC, Commander Hobaugh and Pilot Wilmore talked with CBS News, FOXNews Radio and Nashville's WTVG-TV. At 12:28 UTC, Melvin and Satcher were interviewed by the Tom Joyner Morning Show and at 21:33 UTC, Hobaugh, Melvin and Satcher talked with ESPN's SportCenter, Black Entertainment Television News and WRIC-TV in Richmond, Virginia.

The crew also got prepared for the mission's second spacewalk on Saturday. These tasks included recharging batteries, switching out Robert Satcher's spacesuit for that of Randolph Bresnik and reviewing procedures.

The crew went to their sleep period at 00:28 UTC, a half-hour later than the station crew. Astronauts Foreman and Bresnik were to spend the night in the Quest airlock as part of the overnight "campout" procedure. Again, for the second night in a row, fire and depressurization alarms tripped inside the European Columbus Module and the Quest airlock woke the Atlantis astronauts. The depressurization alarm triggered automatic procedures that brought the airlock back up to the station's normal pressure of 14.7 psi. Because of time needed to reset various systems, Foreman and Bresnik were informed to forgo the normal "campout" procedure and to sleep wherever they liked, at the station's normal pressure. The flight controllers suspected that the alarms are a result of an unresolved problem with a newly arrived Russian Poisk (MRM2) module.

=== November 21 (Flight Day 6 – EVA 2) ===
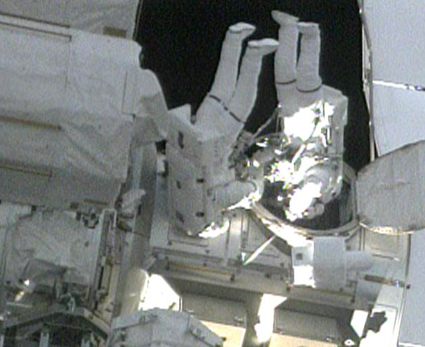
Astronauts Foreman and Bresnik work outside the space station during EVA 2.

Thirty minutes later than planned, Mission Control Center, Houston sent the crew wake-up call at 08:58 UTC.

The major activity for the day was mission's second spacewalk (EVA 2) by astronauts Foreman and Bresnik. Because of last night's space station false alarms sounded at 02:53 UTC, spacewalk was shortened to six hours and delayed the start. Mission Specialist Satcher, serving as the intravehicular crew member helped to direct the spacewalk. The spacewalking pair finished all their assigned work way ahead of timeline with no major problems and completed several "get ahead" tasks originally scheduled for the mission's third spacewalk. EVA 2 marked: 229th spacewalk conducted by U.S. astronauts, the 135th in support of space station assembly and maintenance, 107th spacewalk out of the space station, the fifth for Foreman and the first for Bresnik. Also between STS-123 and STS-129, Michael Foreman has completed five spacewalks totaling 32 hours, 19 minutes and placing him 28th on the all-time list.

Earlier, at 11:32 UTC, Atlantis robotic arm operators Leland Melvin and Robert Satcher lifted ExPRESS Logistics Carrier 2 out of the shuttle payload bay and handed off to space station's robotic arm, Canadarm2. Just before the beginning of Saturday's spacewalk, at 14:14 UTC Mission Specialists Leland Melvin and Nicole Stott operating Canadarm2 mated the Carrier to the Outboard Payload Attachment System (PAS) on the S3 segment of the space station's main truss.

Ground engineers declared that a minor ring misalignment on Atlantis' Orbiter Docking System (ODS) is of no issue. They cleared the system for undocking and redocking with the space station—a safe haven scenario which would only be initiated in the event Atlantis has to return to the ISS. The docking ring had lost alignment during ring extension on flight day 2.

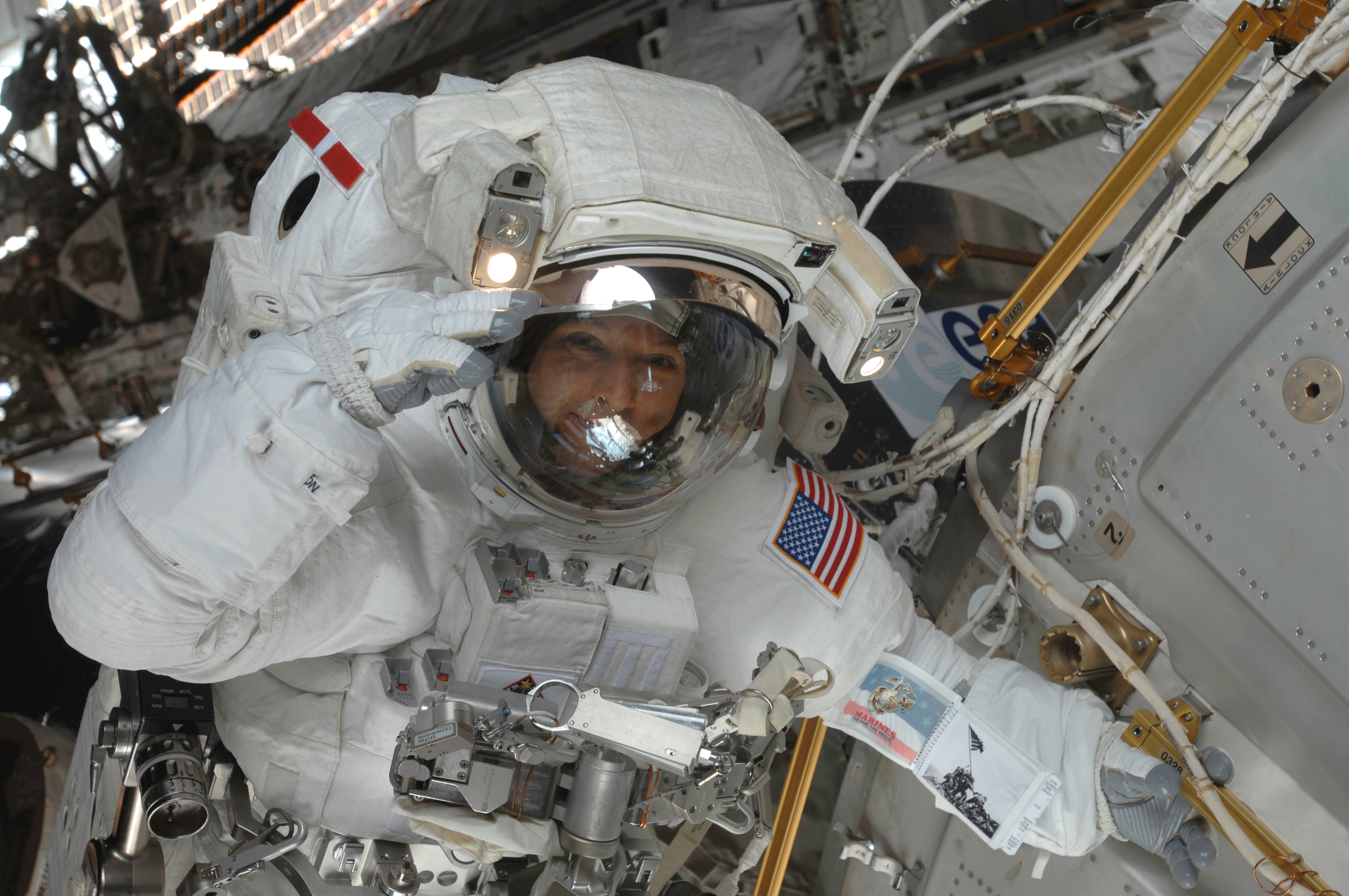
Astronaut Bresnik positioned near the Columbus module

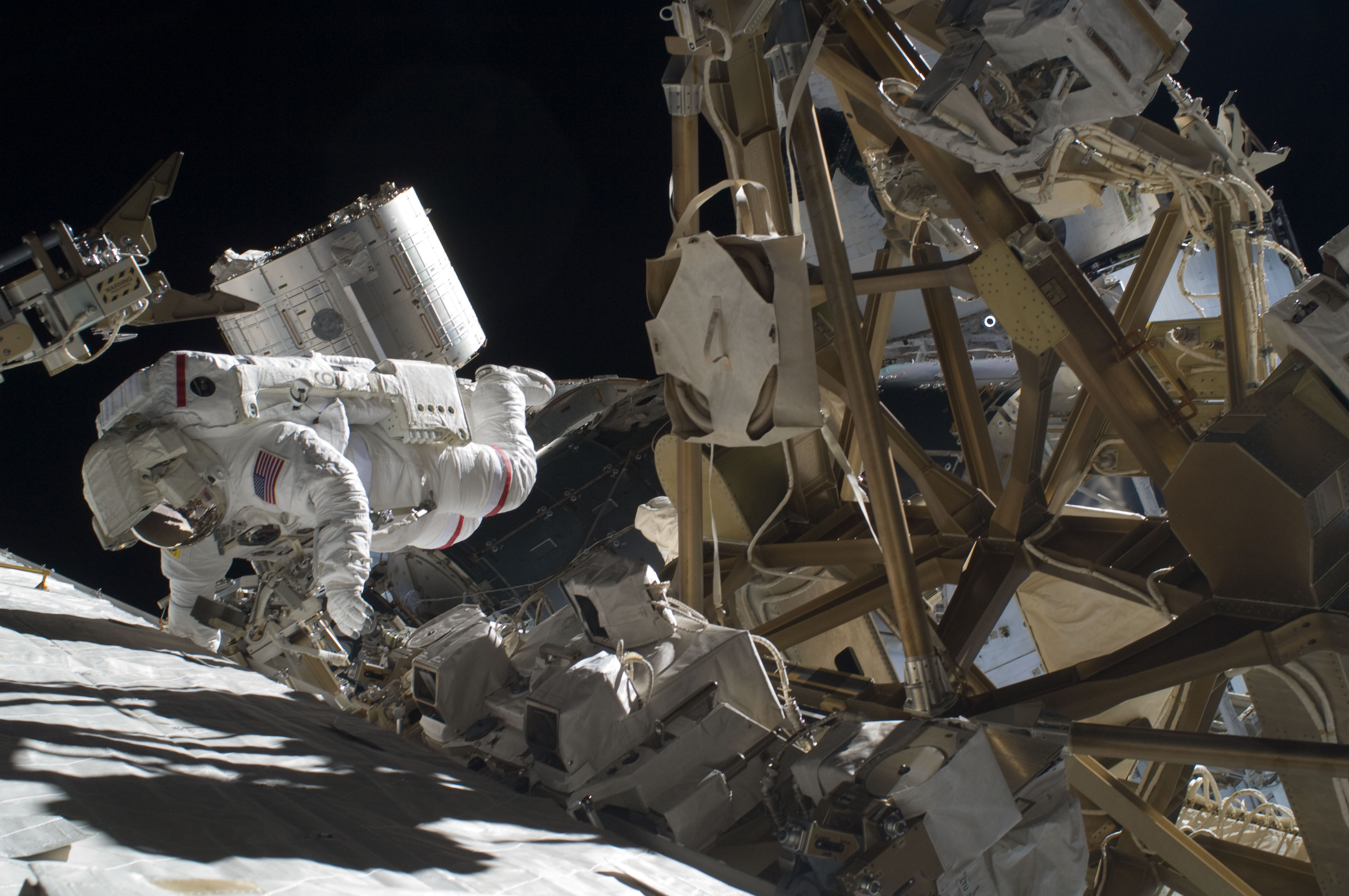
Astronaut Foreman performing a task during EVA 2

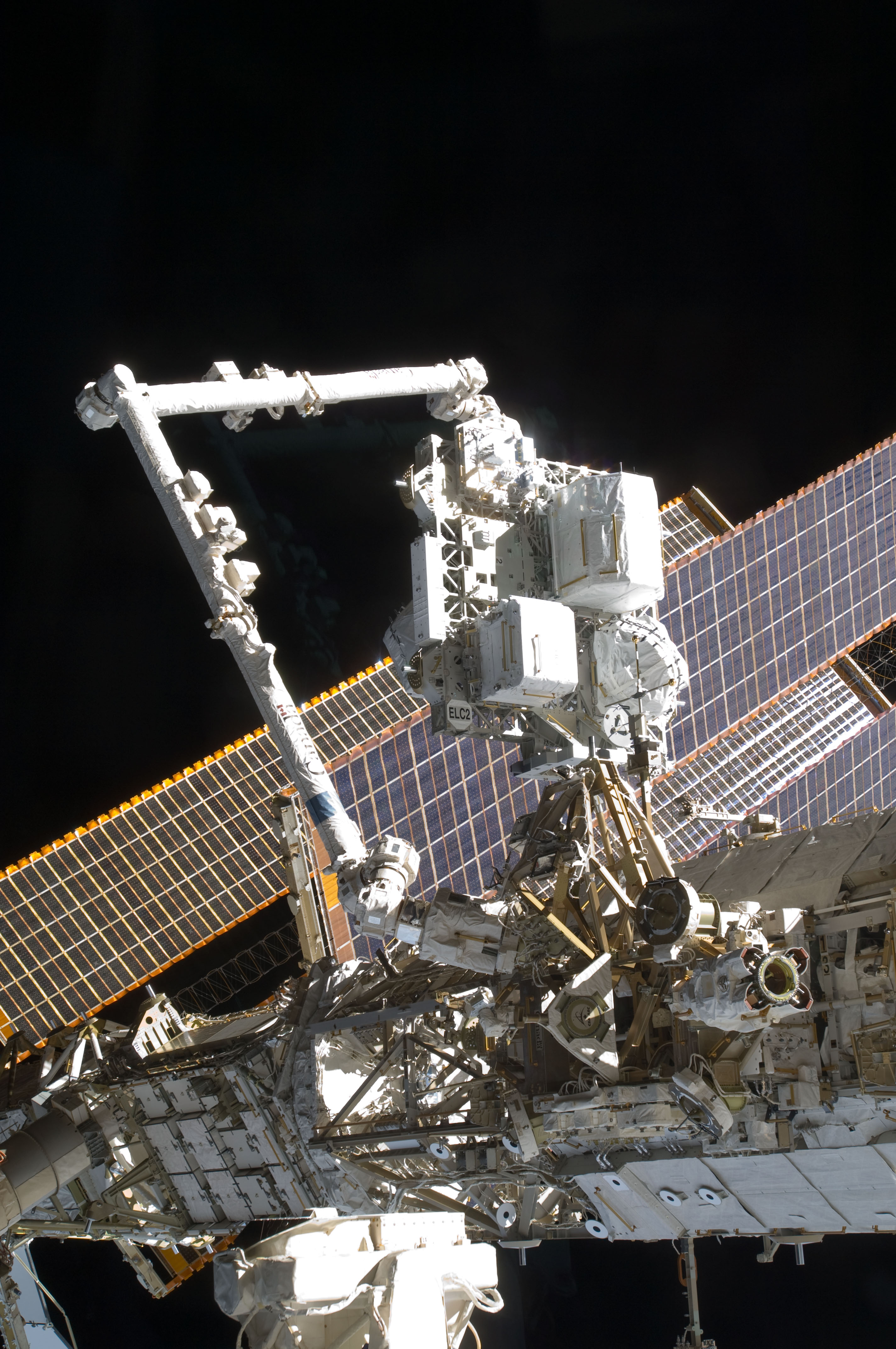
Installation of ELC-2 on the S3 segment of the station's main truss.

=== November 22 (Flight Day 7 – Off duty) ===
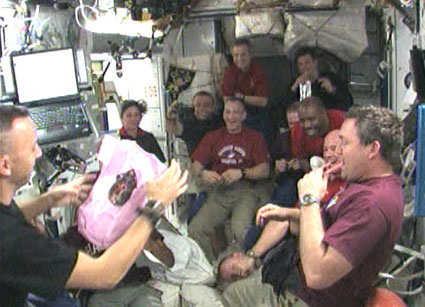
Mission Specialist Randolph Bresnik, STS-129 and Expedition 21 crews celebrating the birth of his daughter, Abigail Mae Bresnik.

The crew was awakened at 07:58 UTC. The day that began with some exciting news from Randolph Bresnik to Mission Control in Houston. Bresnik reported the birth of his daughter, Abigail Mae Bresnik at 17:04 UTC Saturday. He had got the news by private phone patch through mission control shortly after the crew was awakened. Mission specialist Bresnik is the second astronaut to become a father while in space. The first was astronaut Michael Fincke, whose wife gave birth to a baby girl while he was working at the International Space Station in 2004.

The crew got a half-day off and earlier on the day and discussed their spaceflight with reporters. Astronauts Wilmore and Melvin, Satcher and Stott talked with reporters from WTTG-TV in Washington, D.C., Bay News 9 in Tampa, Fla., and WBBM Radio in Chicago. Wilmore, Melvin and Stott also supported an educational PAO TV event with Tennessee Technological University, Cookeville, attended by Tennessee students, the President of the University, and Representative Barton Gordon (Democratic-Tennessee). The Tennessee Technological University alumnus Wilmore's parents were also present.

Some astronauts on both shuttle and station crews worked part-time to transfer equipment from the shuttle to the station and back, and to investigate false alarms sounded on Thursday and Friday. Preparations also continued for third and the last spacewalk of the mission. Shuttle crew members as well as the station's crew joined in an hour-long spacewalk procedures review just before bedtime. Satcher and Bresnik prepared tools for their spacewalk, with help from Foreman. The two spacewalkers began their "campout" procedure in the Quest airlock.

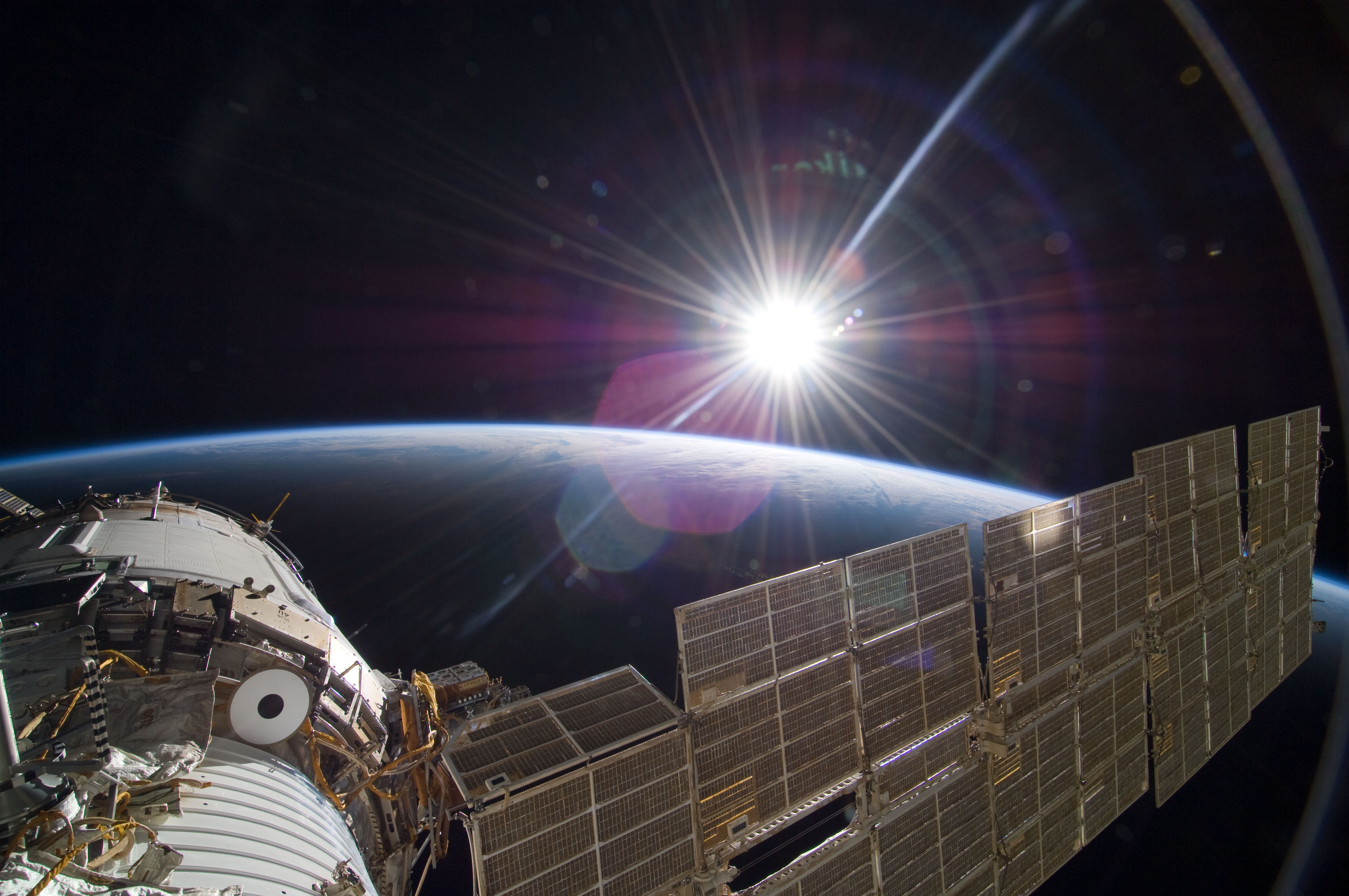
Bright Sun photographed by one of the STS-129 crew members from the Russian section of the ISS

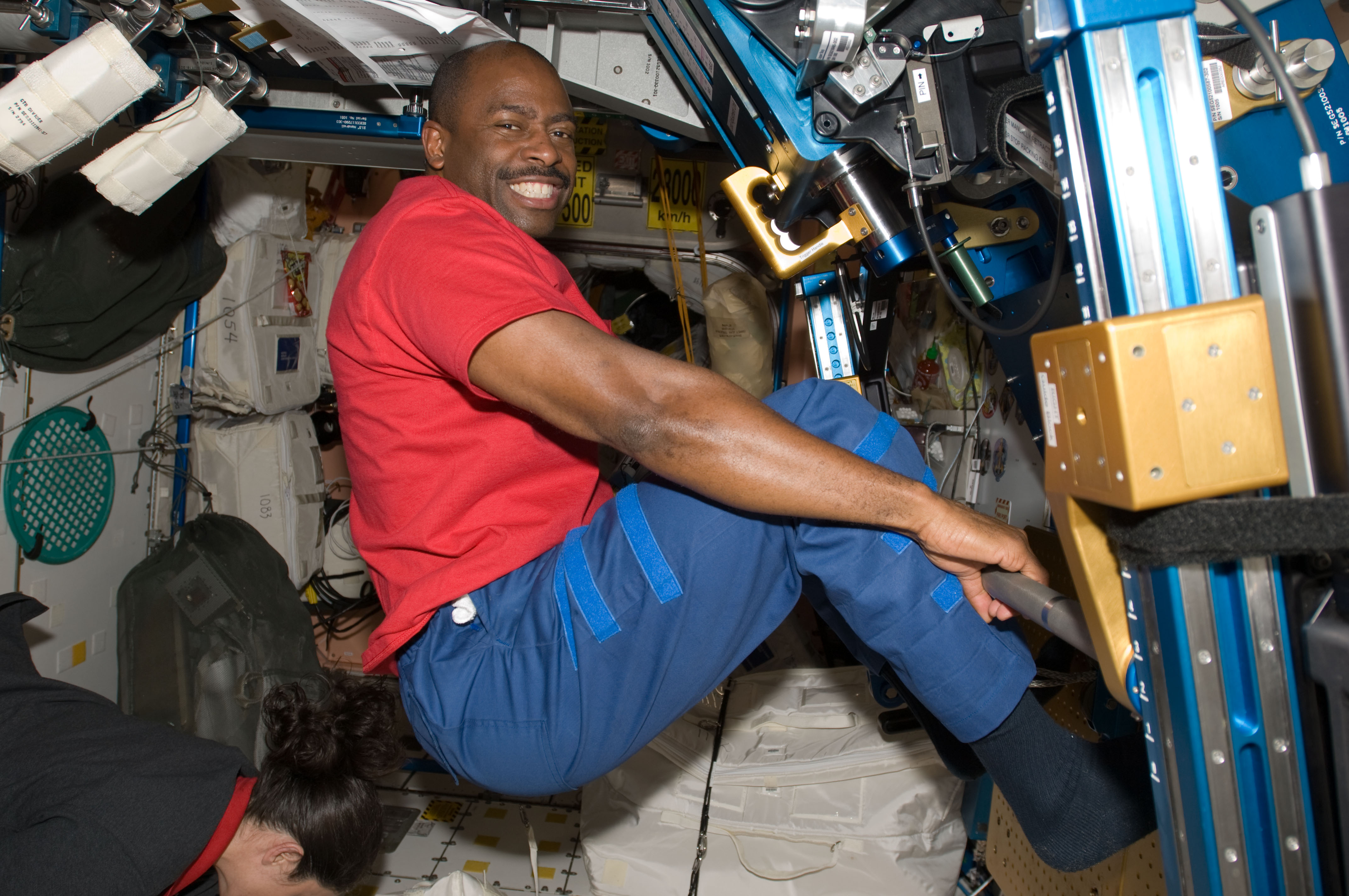
Mission Specialist Leland Melvin exercising inside the Unity module

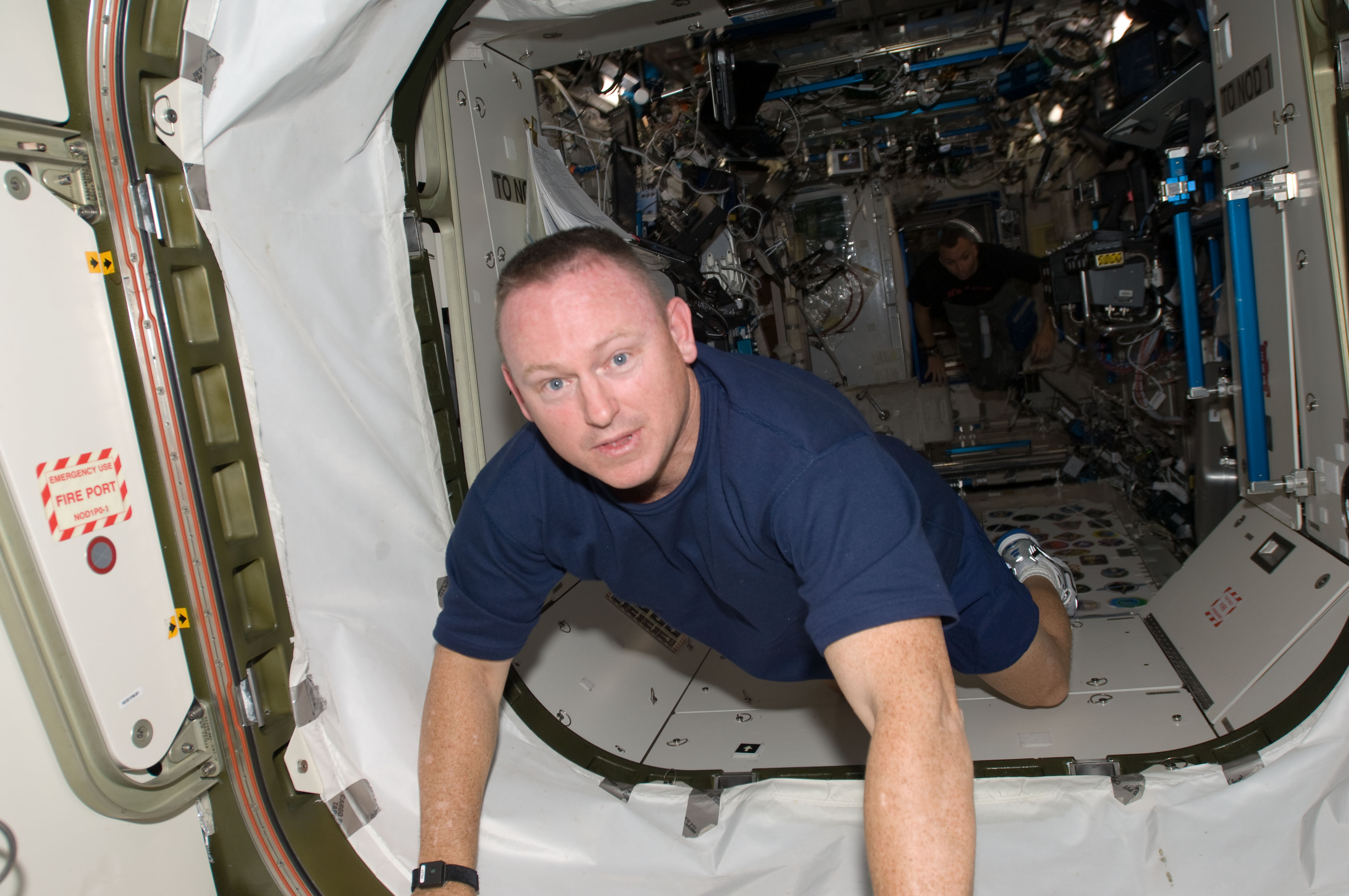
STS-129 Pilot Barry Wilmore moving into Node 1

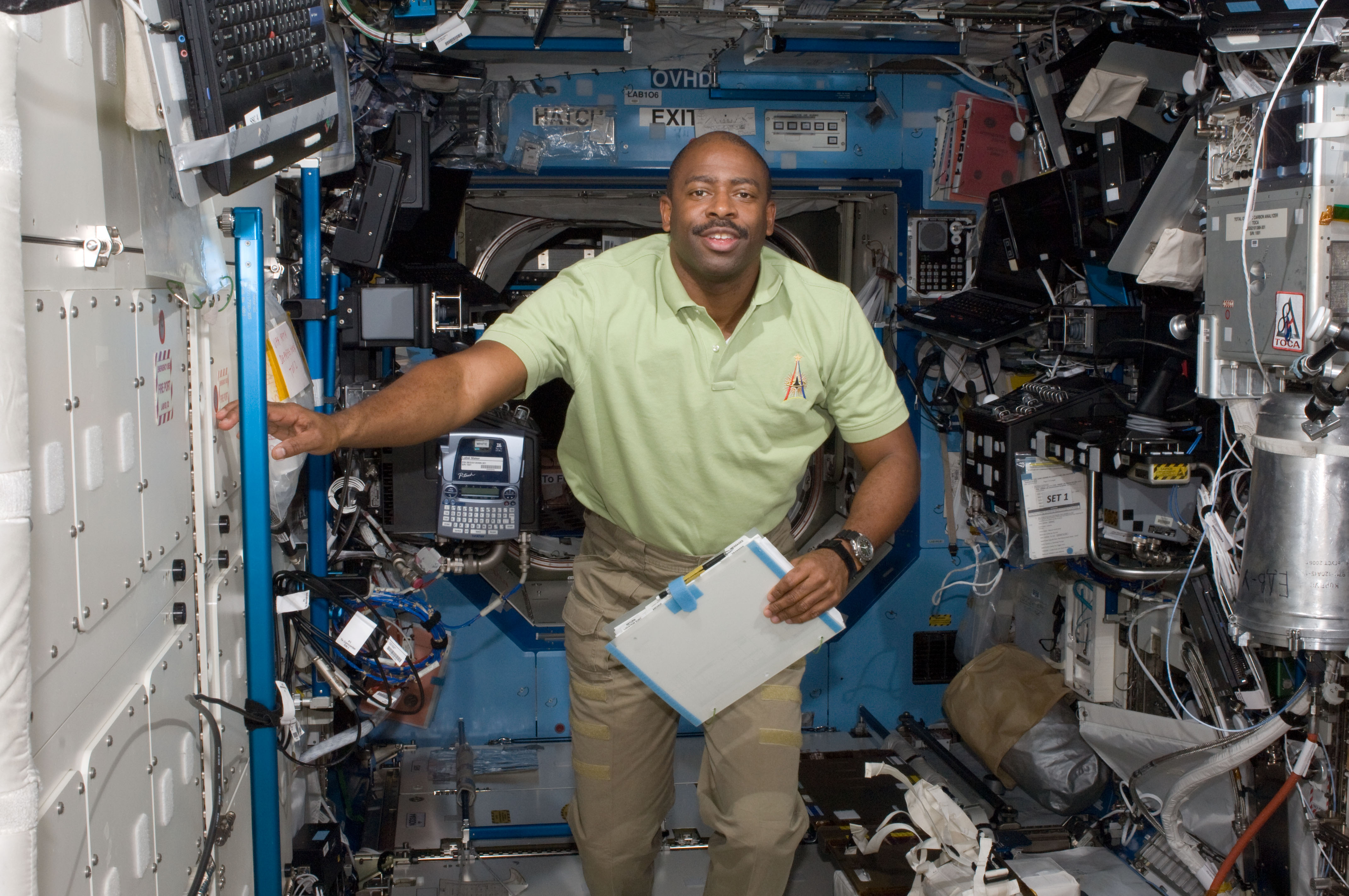
Leland Melvin inside the US lab

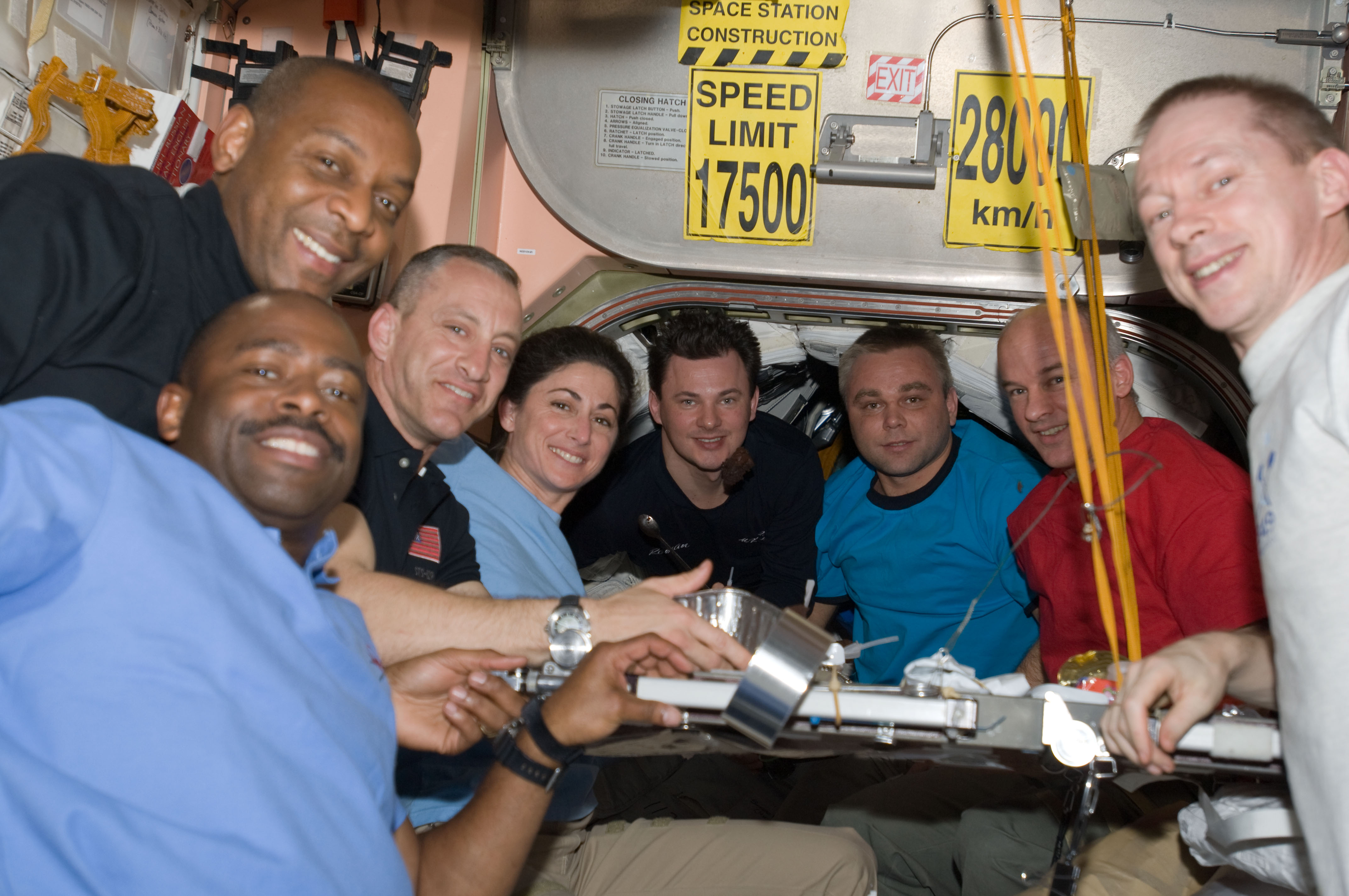
STS-129 crew members in Node 1

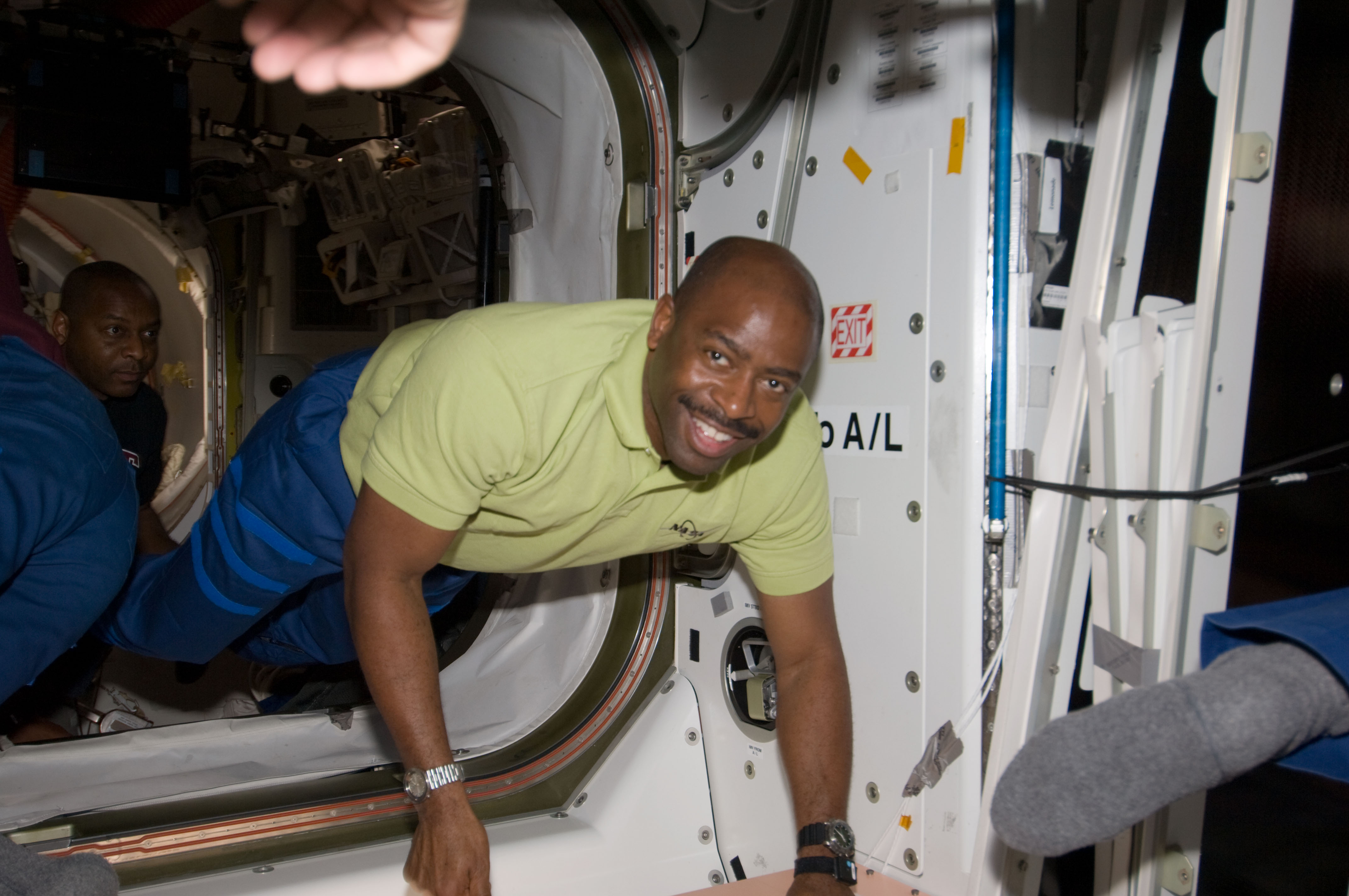
Leland floating inside the Airlock

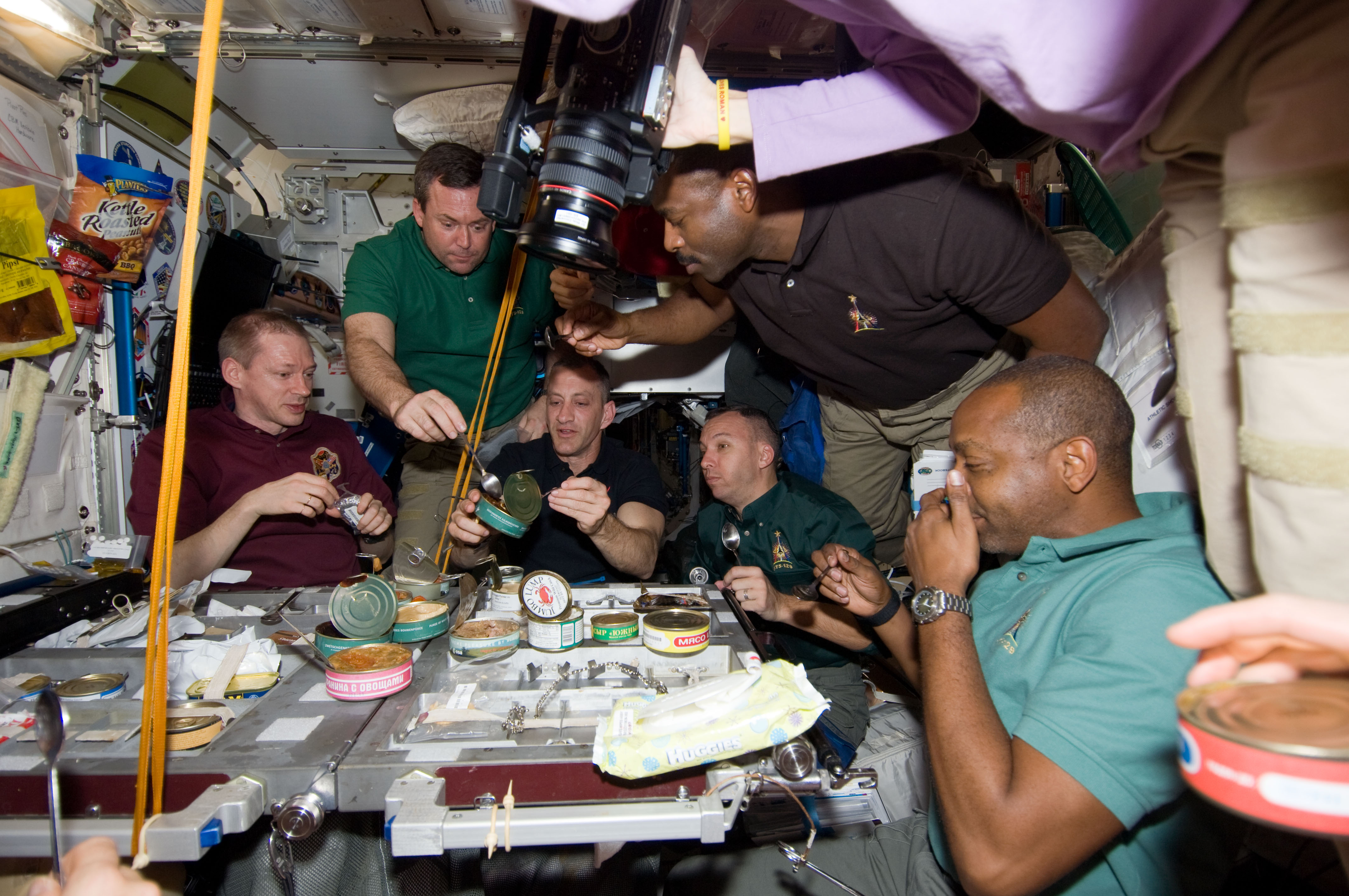
The crew having dinner in Node 1

=== November 23 (Flight Day 8 – EVA 3) ===
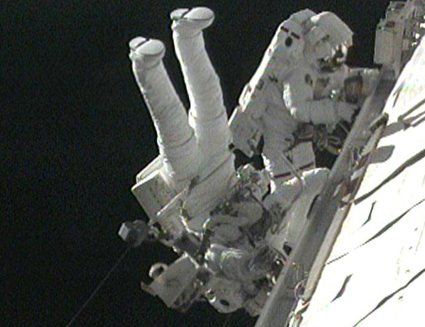
Mission Specialists Satcher and Bresnik work outside the ISS during the final spacewalk

Atlantis' crew awoke at 07:28 UTC.

The major activity for the day was mission's third and final spacewalk (EVA 3) by astronauts Satcher and Bresnik. For identification, Satcher wore an all-white spacesuit while Bresnik wore a spacesuit with broken red stripes. Atlantis Mission Specialist Foreman, the intravehicular crew member for EVA 3 choreographed the activities and coordinated communications between the spacewalkers and Mission Control. Astronauts Melvin and Wilmore operated the station's robotic Canadarm2.

The spacewalk started just over an hour later than planned due to Satcher reinserting a valve that became detached in his spacesuit drink bag. The bag is contained in the spacesuit and allows spacewalkers to sip water throughout their activity.

Working ahead of schedule most of time, the two mission specialists completed all the primary jobs they were assigned and all the "get ahead" work that was added to their timeline. EVA 3 marked: the 230th conducted by U.S. astronauts, the 136th in support of Space Station assembly and maintenance, totaling 849 hours, 18 minutes and the 108th spacewalk out of the space station, totaling 662 hours, 3 minutes. It was also the second for both Satcher and Bresnik.

The role of other Atlantis and Space Station crew members were mostly on supporting the spacewalk and completing cargo transfers between the shuttle and the ISS. Station Commander De Winne and STS-129 Mission Specialist Melvin shut down and packed the broken Urine Processor Assembly/Distillation Assembly (UPA DA) and then transferred it to the shuttle for stowage on the Middeck. De Winne working with STS-129 Commander Hobaugh afterwards, terminated the transfer of Nitrogen gas from Atlantis to the ISS.

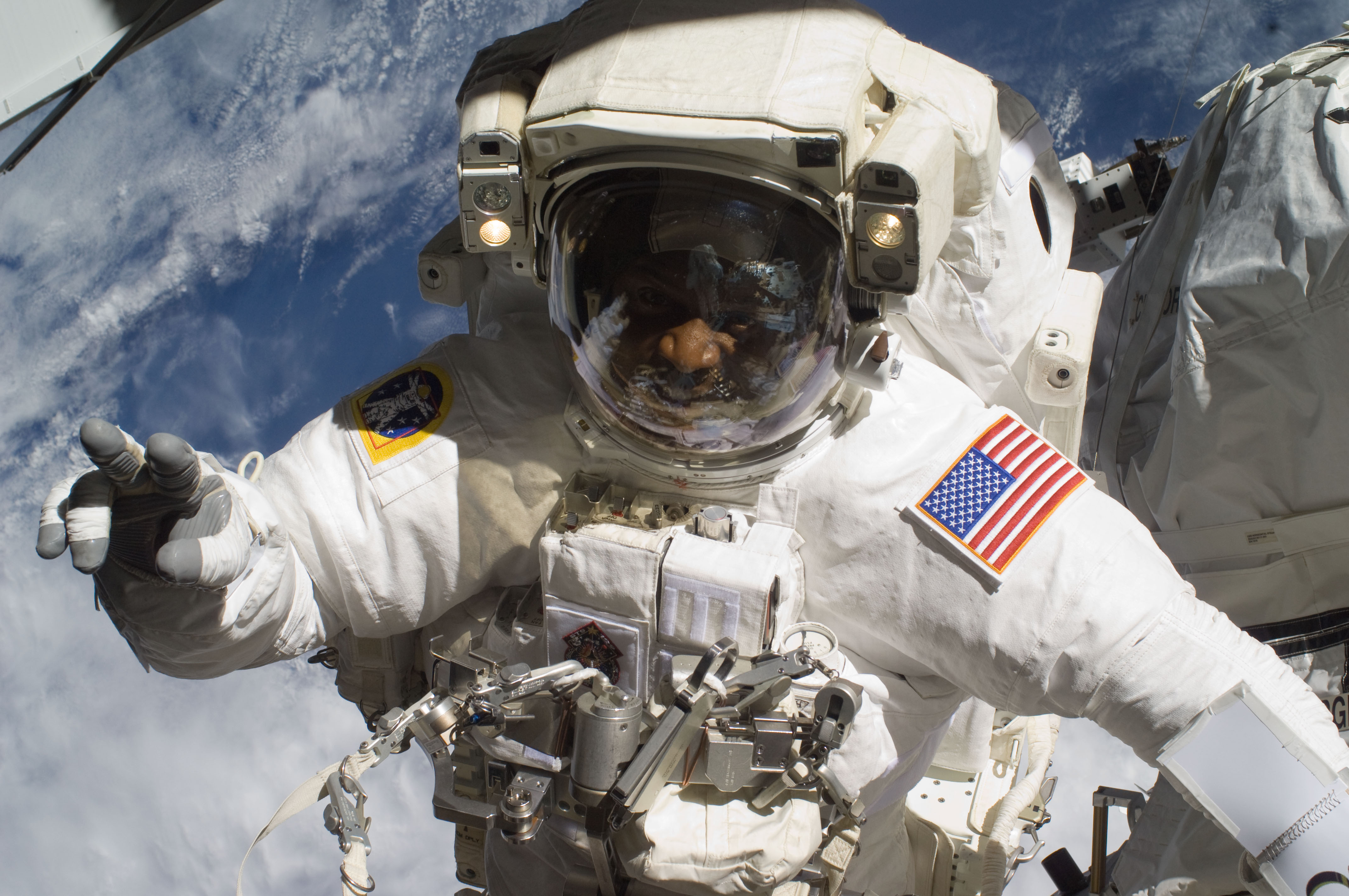
Robert Satcher participating in EVA 3

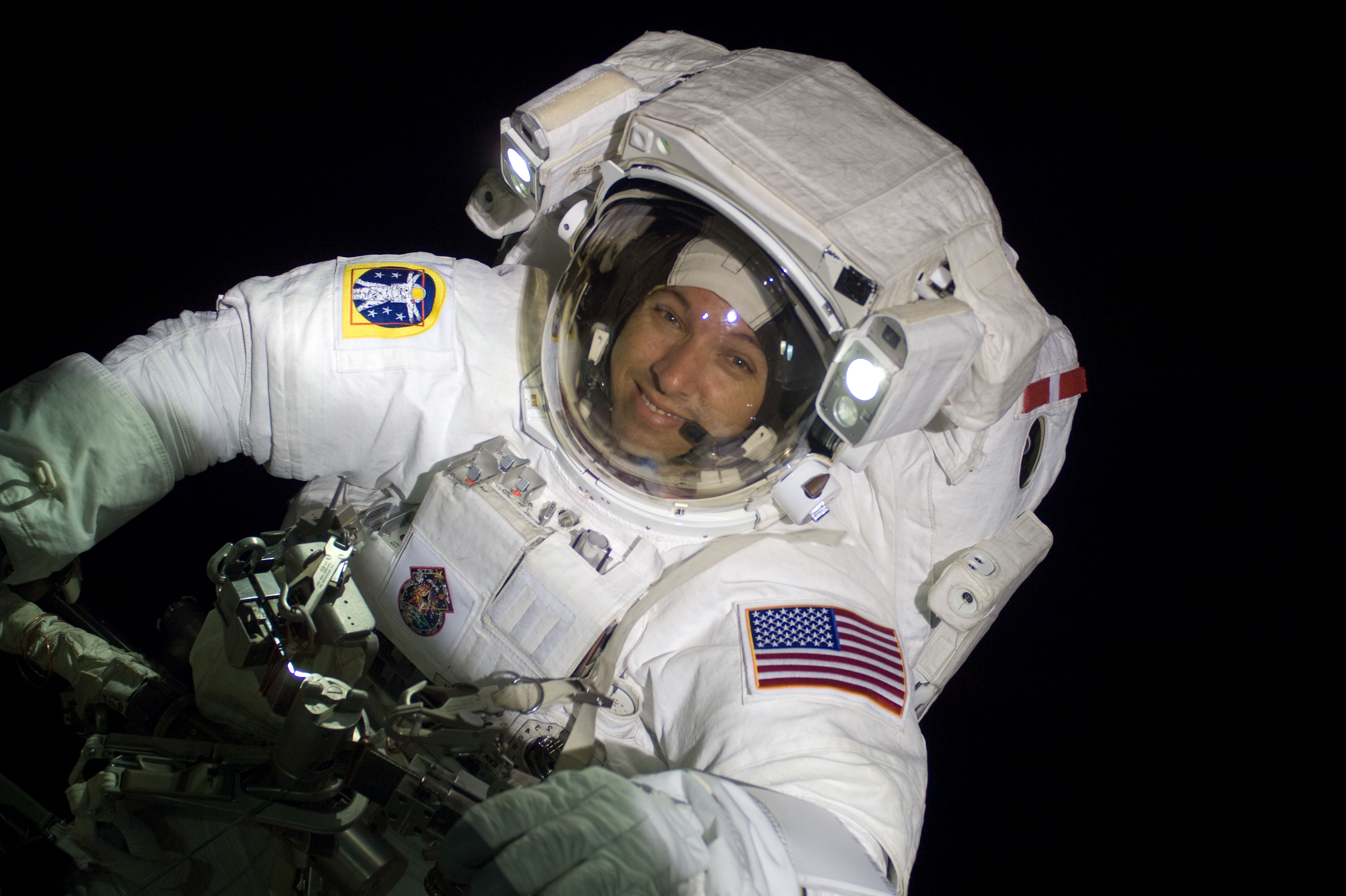
Randolph Bresnik participating in EVA 3

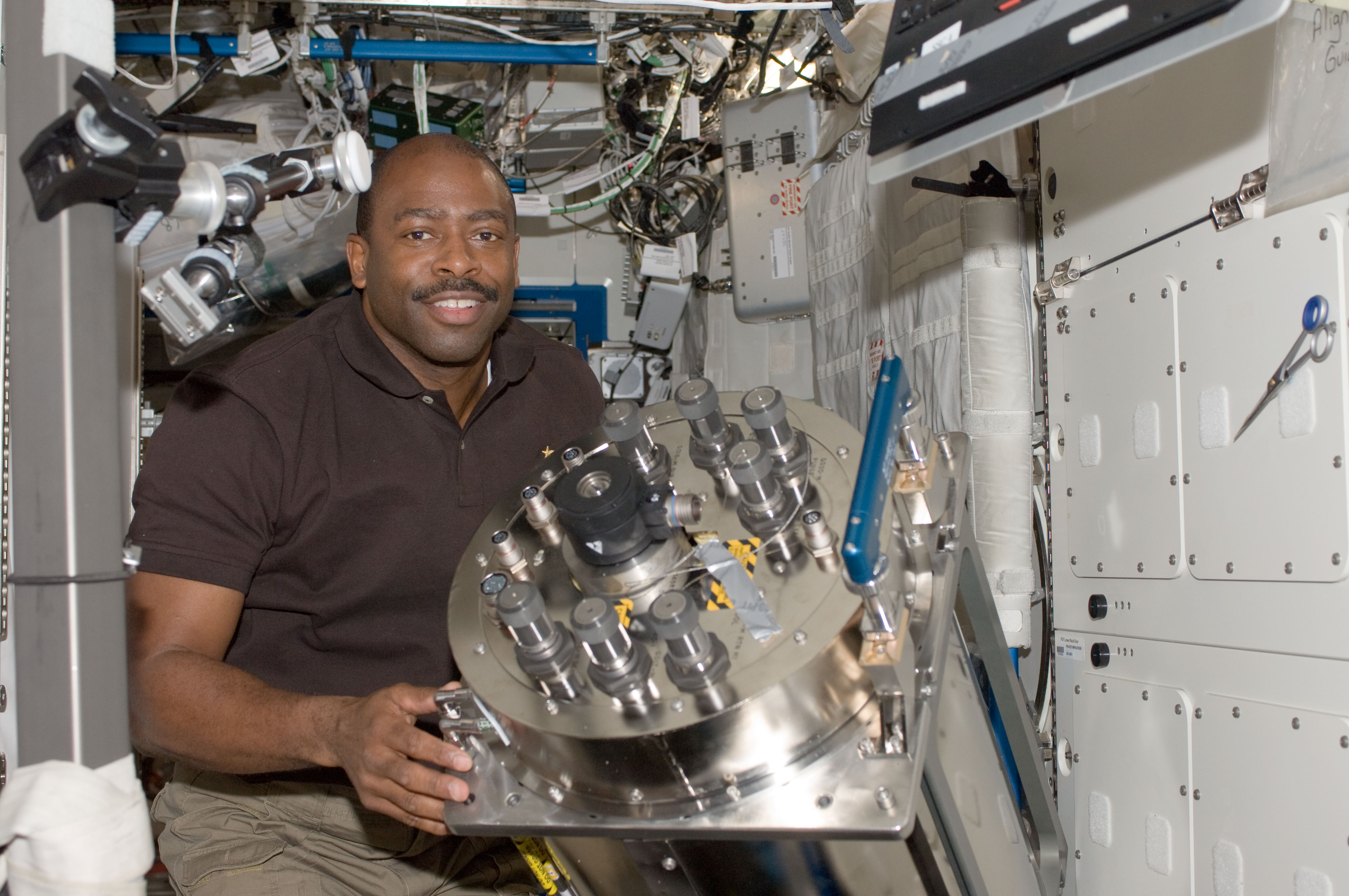
Leland Melvin holds the busted Urine Processor Assembly/Distillation Assembly

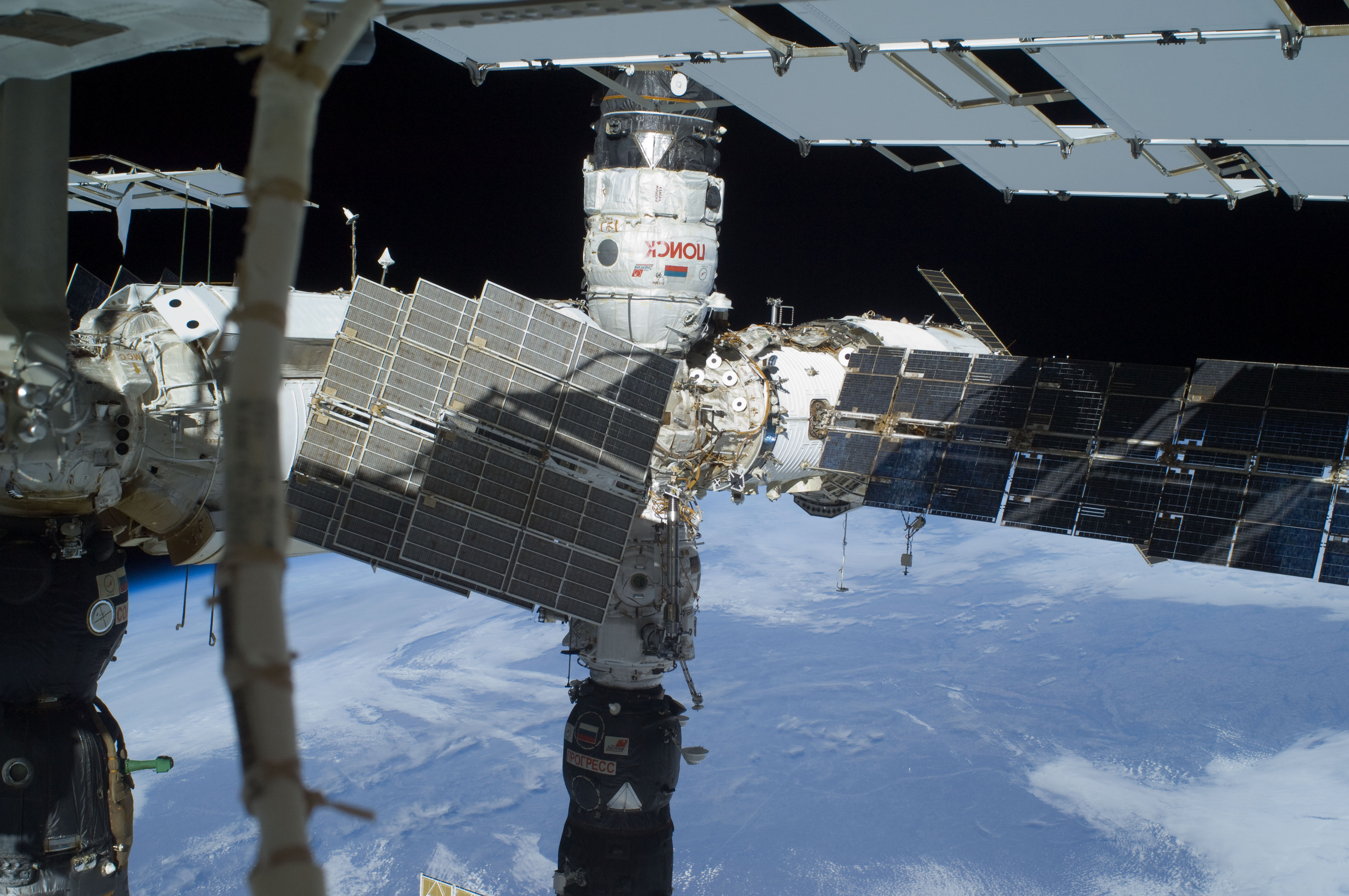
The Russian segment of the ISS photographed by an EVA 3 astronaut

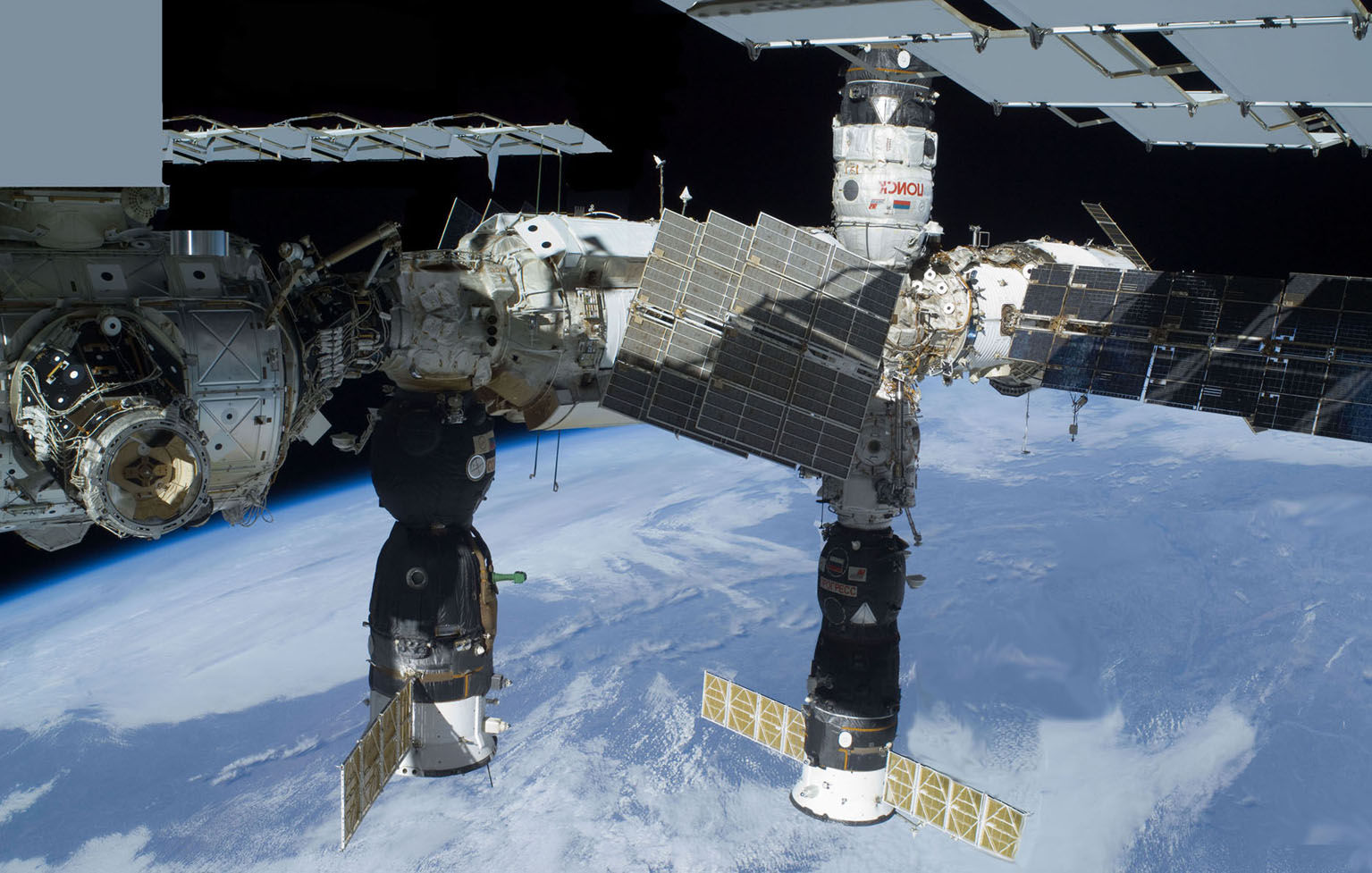
Composite of photos of the Russian Segment during EVA-3

=== November 24 (Flight Day 9 – Hatch closure) ===
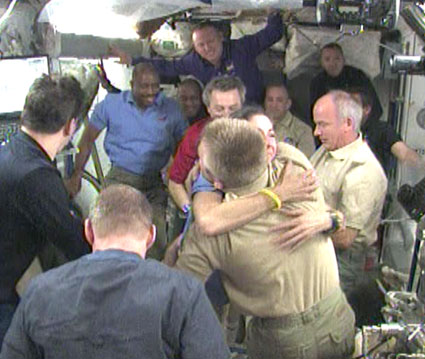
The STS-129 and Expedition 21 crew members bid farewell.

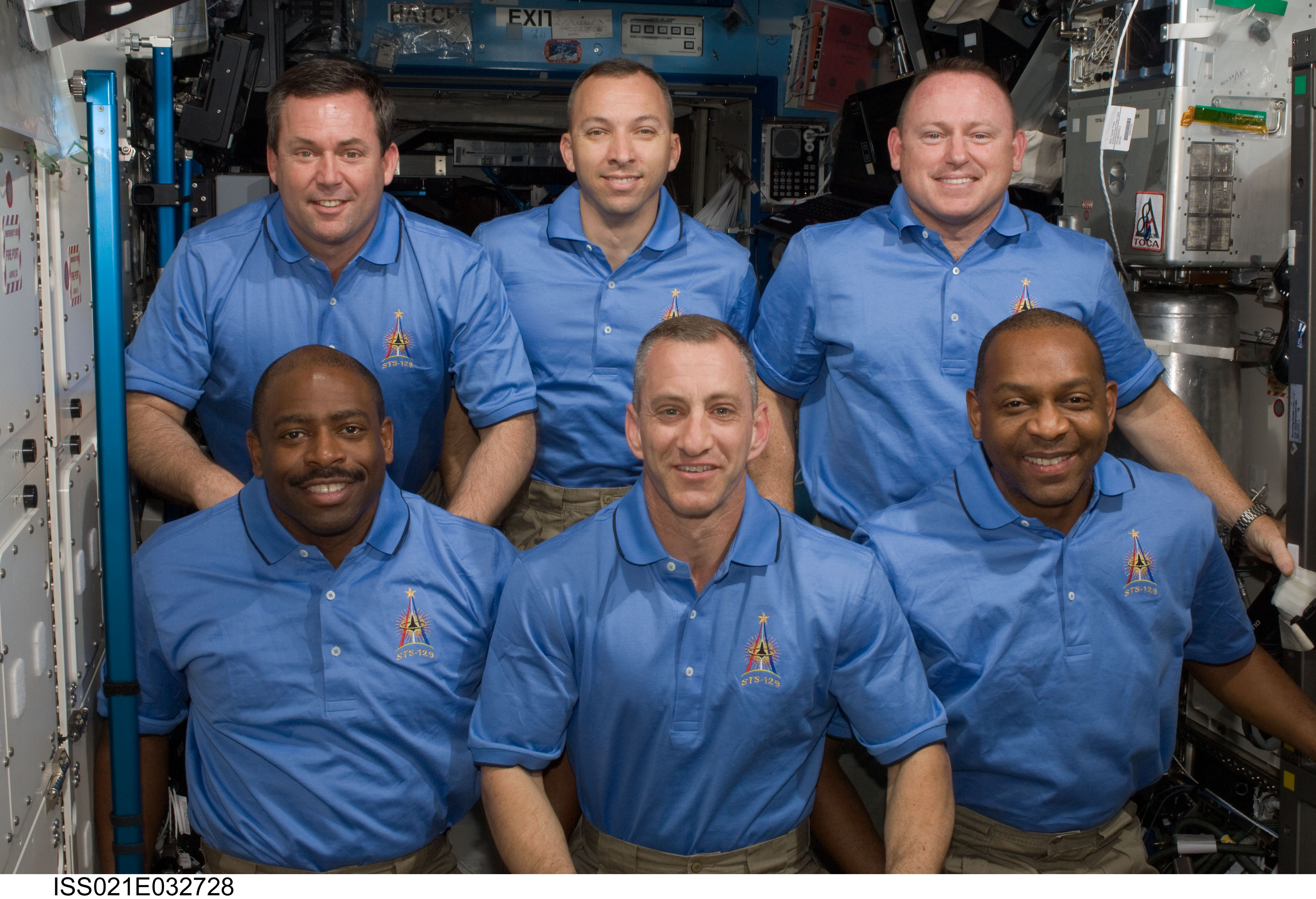
STS-129 crew members portrait inside the US lab

The crew woke at 06:58 UTC. Earlier on the day, Atlantis astronauts used the maneuvering thrusters of the shuttle to boost the Space Station to a slightly higher orbit. This 27-minute maneuver changed the station's velocity by 2.5 feet per second and raised its orbit by about 1.5 kilometres (0.93 mi).

Final internal transfers continued throughout the day. Around 1,400 lbs of water from Atlantis to the Space Station was handed over. During 5 days of joint work, the crews also transferred 2,100 pounds of to be returned experiments and items.

Inside ISS, around 12:00 UTC a false smoke and fire alarm triggered by the Japanese Kibo laboratory sounded for about 4 minutes. Mission Control in Houston concluded that stirred up dust particles due to transfer operations aboard the station might have sounded the alarm. This was the third false station alarm during the STS-129 mission. The two previous alarms originated in the new Russian Poisk module.

Atlantis and the station crews also joined together for a traditional news conference with reporters at NASA centers, Mission Control in Russia and Canada, and TF1 evening news in France. The interactive event was aired live at 13:00 UTC. During the news conference, Expedition 21 astronaut Robert Thirsk said "The space station now is nearly complete". The station is currently about 86% complete.

Aboard the Destiny laboratory at 15:00 UTC shortly after a joint crew photo, Frank De Winne, the first European Space Agency commander of the Space Station handed over his command to astronaut Jeffrey Williams. The Change of Command Ceremony was the first-of-its-kind command handover during a shuttle mission on the ISS. Just after the ceremony, Atlantis crew members began a two-hour, off-duty period.

At 17:43 UTC, Atlantis' astronauts bid farewell to the Station's crew inside the Harmony module and crossed the threshold into the shuttle. The hatches between the Space Shuttle and the International Space Station were closed at 18:12 UTC in preparation for the Atlantis' undocking. The hatch closure ended 5 days, 23 hours and 44 minutes of joint time between Atlantis and the station crews. Atlantis crew used their first hour separated from the station crew to get ready for undocking. They checked out rendezvous tools and set up a centerline camera and carried out leak checks on the Orbiter Docking System (ODS).

=== November 25 (Flight Day 10 – Undocking) ===
Shuttle crew members were awakened at 06:29 UTC. Undocking operations began about an hour before the separation of the shuttle and the Space Station. The two spacecraft undocked at 09:53 UTC. The total docked time was 6 days, 17 hours and 2 minutes. After undocking, Wilmore piloted Atlantis to a point about 450 feet ahead of the station, then, began a flyaround. Once the flyaround was completed, Atlantis performed separation burns to increase the distance between the shuttle and the ISS and left the Space Station complex area at about 10:36 UTC.

During a routine flush out of the shuttle waste water tank Wednesday morning, the astronauts ran into a problem. Mission Control noticed a reduction in the flow from the nozzle that vents the waste water into space. The tank can hold 165 pounds of liquid waste and the crew only managed to get it down to about 80 pounds. Later in the day, astronauts used the camera on Orbital Boom Sensor System (OBSS) to survey the condition of the nozzle. Since no ice was found, Flight Controllers told the crew that it is likely that there is a blockage in the line.

Standard late inspections of the Thermal Protection System took place later on Flight Day 10. About 12:15 UTC, Wilmore and Melvin began grappling and unberthing the OBSS for the survey of the shuttle's heat shield. With help from Bresnik, they inspected the reinforced carbon-carbon of the right wing leading edge, then the nose cap and the left wing leading edge. The inspection tasks took more than five hours.

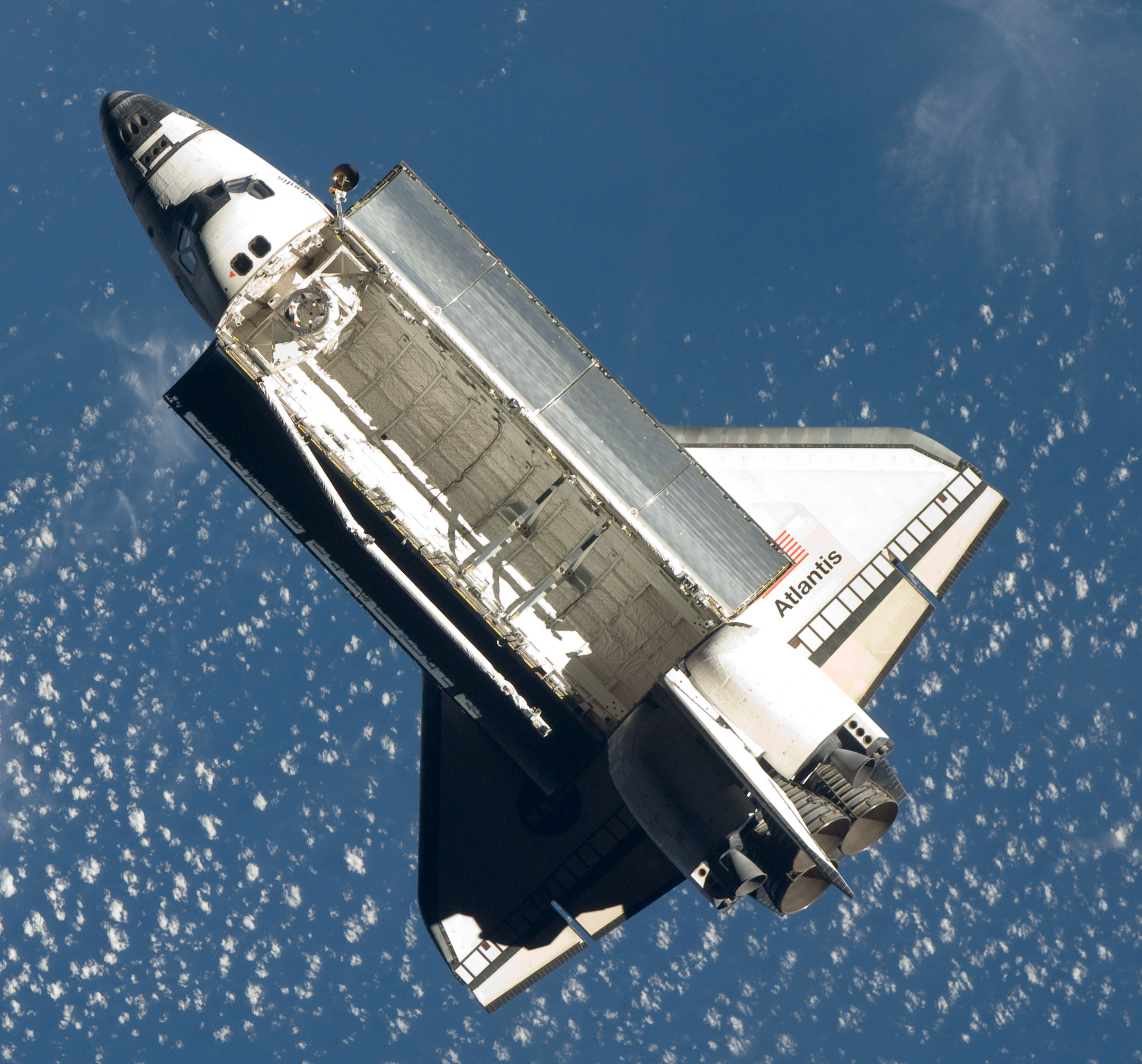
Atlantis flies around the Space Station after undocking.

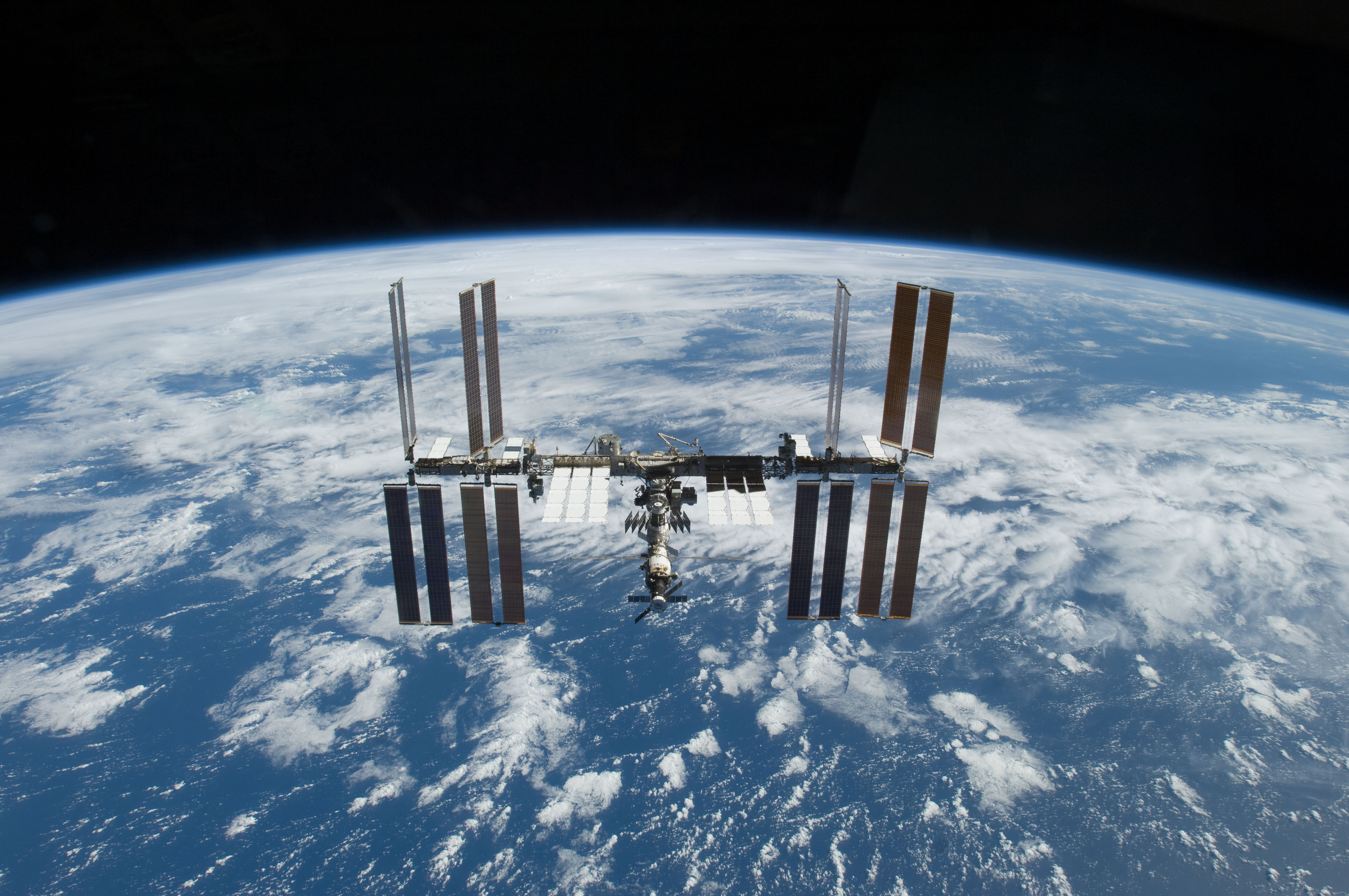
The International Space Station photographed after undocking.

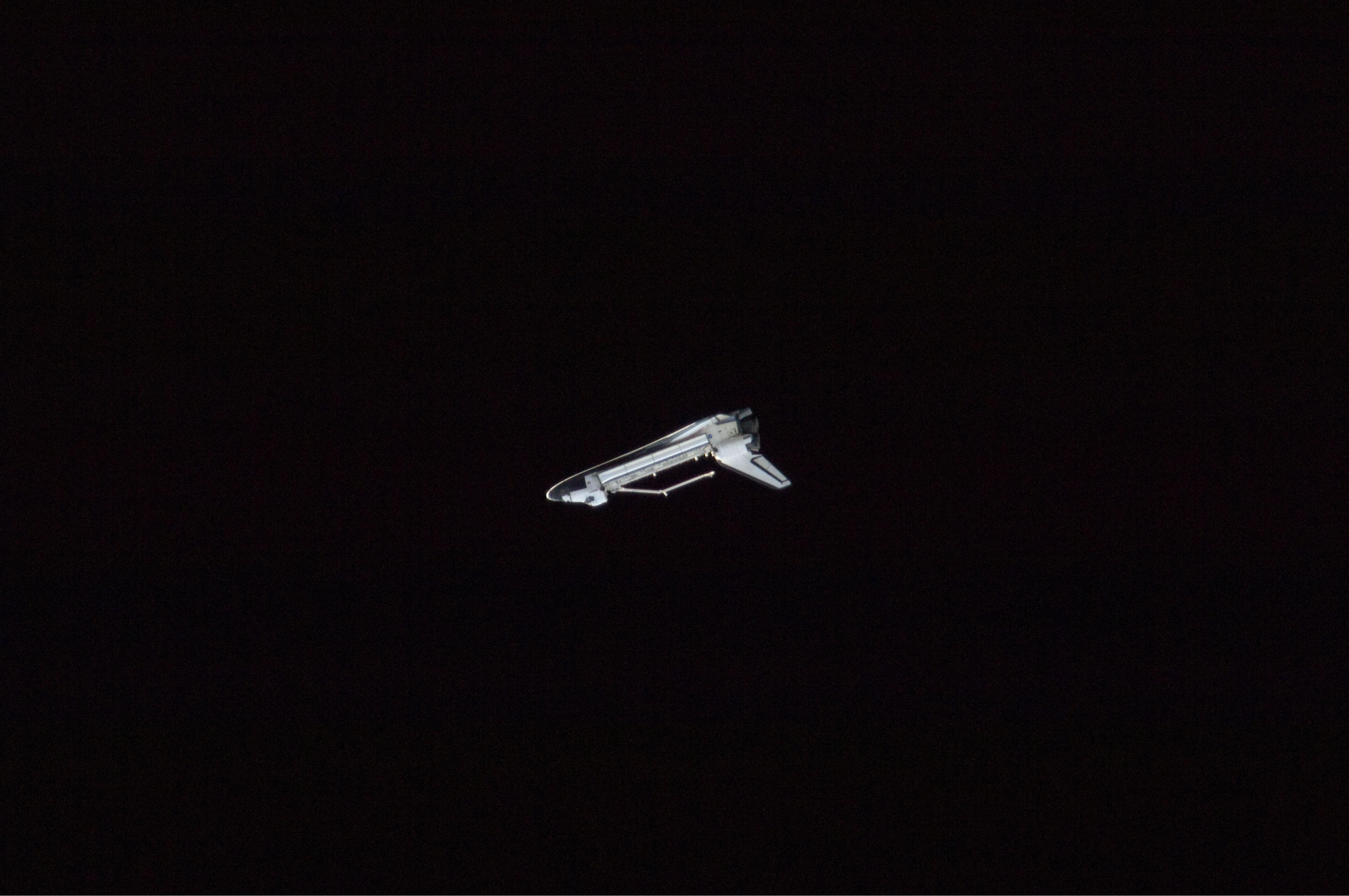
Profile view of Atlantis soon after post-undocking relative separation.

=== November 26 (Flight Day 11 – End of mission preparation) ===
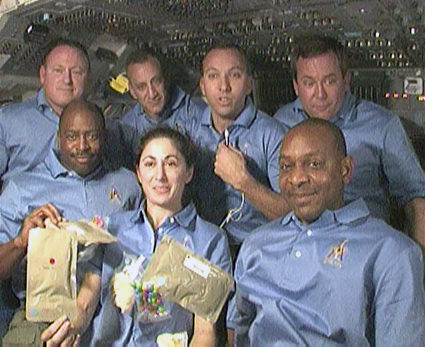
Astronauts show some of their Thanksgiving food items during the media interview.

The crew was awakened at 06:28 UTC for their final full day in space. STS-129 was the eighth shuttle mission in history to mark the U.S. Thanksgiving holiday up in space and the second time for Atlantis. The first time for Atlantis was during STS-61-B mission in 1985.

"The first big news of the day is that our TPS, the Thermal Protection System has been cleared for entry" said STS-129 Entry Flight Director Bryan Lunney early in the day's Mission Status Briefing. Later, he also mentioned that "Atlantis is in great shape, the crew is in great shape ready for de-orbit tomorrow".

The crew spent time stowing items in the shuttle's cabin in preparation for the return to Earth. Cabin stowage started at 08:48 UTC.

Atlantis crew tested shuttle's re-entry systems. Commander Hobaugh and Pilot Wilmore, with help from Mission Specialist Bresnik checked out the Flight Control System (FCS). Immediately afterwards, at 10:58 UTC, the astronauts test fired Reaction Control System (RCS) thrusters. The RCS thrusters control the shuttle's orientation as it descends and begins its re-entry through the atmosphere. All astronauts gathered for a deorbit briefing a little after 11:00 UTC, just before their midday meal. The Thanksgiving dinner aboard Atlantis was more traditional than expected.

Earlier in the day, astronauts carried out the Shuttle Exhaust Ion Turbulence Experiments (SEITE) burn. The burn was radial down (nose to the Earth) such that the burn plume was observed by the orbiting C/NOFS satellite. Later, the Shuttle Ionospheric Modification with Pulsed Localized Exhaust Experiments (SIMPLEX) burn was conducted, with the burn plume observed by the Arecibo ground station.

All seven crew members took a break at 13:13 UTC for a 20-minute talk with news media representatives. During the chat they took questions from ABC Radio, WTVT-TV in Tampa and KCBS in Los Angeles.

After setup on the mid-deck of a recumbent seat for Nicole Stott and stowage of the Ku-band antenna used for high data rate communications during the mission at 19:34 UTC.

=== November 27 (Flight Day 12 – Re-entry and landing) ===
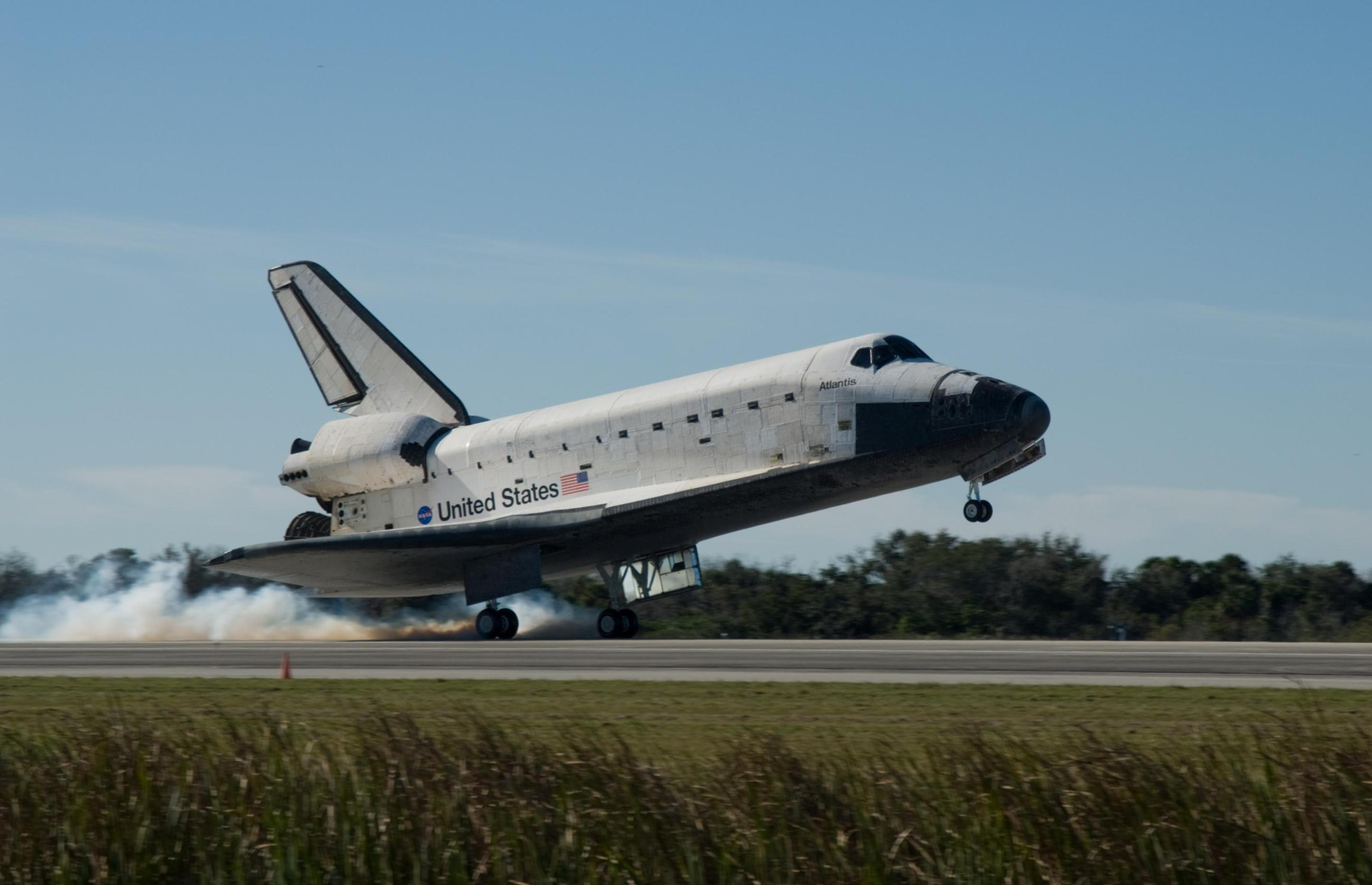
Atlantis touches down after 11 days in space, completing the STS-129 mission.

Landing video (8 mins 4 secs)

The Shuttle crew awoke Friday at 05:28 UTC. With weather looking good at the Kennedy Space Center, and nothing standing in the way of landing, Flight Director Bryan Lunney gave the "go" signal to close the payload bay doors at 10:52 UTC. Mission Control also instructed the astronauts to begin "fluid loading" – a protocol that aids the astronauts' readjustment to gravity. The crew strapped into their seats at 12:37 UTC in preparation for a landing. NASA operators gave the "go" for the deorbit burn and at 13:37 UTC, flying upside down and backwards above the southern Indian Ocean just west of Indonesia, Atlantis fired its orbital maneuvering system (OMS) engines for 2 minutes and 47 seconds. The deorbit burn decelerated the orbiter by about 211 miles per hour, enough to lower its orbital perigee into the upper atmosphere. Atlantis encountered the first traces of Earth's atmosphere, known as "entry interface", at 14:12 UTC at an altitude of 399,000 feet flying over the Pacific Ocean. At 14:26 UTC, eighteen minutes before touchdown, the orbiter was travelling at Mach 22; nine minutes later the orbiter was "gliding" at Mach 6. The shuttle's ground track took it along the east coast of Mexico's Yucatán Peninsula, across the Gulf of Mexico and cross the Florida coast south of Fort Myers.

Atlantis' main landing gear wheels touched down at 09:44:23 am EST (14:44:23 UTC) on Runway 33, followed by the nose wheel at 9:44:36 am EST (14:44:36 UTC). The shuttle's wheels stopped at 9:45:05 am EST (14:45:05 UTC). This was the 72nd Space Shuttle landing at Kennedy Space Center. As the shuttle rolled to a halt, Commander Hobaugh announced "Houston, Atlantis, wheels stop". CAPCOM Christopher Ferguson replied the crew, "Roger, wheels stopped, Atlantis, that was a picture-perfect end to a top-fuel mission to the space station. Everybody, welcome back to Earth, especially you, Nicole."

Atlantis had two opportunities to land on November 27, 2009, with two more on November 28, 2009 – all targeting Kennedy Space Center. If the November 27, 2009, landing was waved off for some reason, the shuttle had consumables on board to allow Atlantis to remain in space until November 30, 2009.

After working through the checklists to safely power down the orbiter for about an hour, the crew got out of Atlantis and into the Crew Transport Vehicle. Exiting the vehicle without Stott, they performed the traditional walk-around of the shuttle and met with employees from NASA. Speaking briefly to the press following the walk-around, Commander Hobaugh said "We really had truly an amazing mission". He went to add, "We had no hitches. It was not us, it was not any single group, but it was just an incredible team from all around the nation".

Post-landing Crew Conference was held later in the day. Five STS-129 astronauts attended the conference. Mission Specialists, Randolph Bresnik and Nicole Stott were absent. Bresnik had flown home right away aboard a NASA training jet to be with his wife and new baby daughter. Stott was to take up standard medical checkups after her 91 days in space aboard the International Space Station.

Later in the afternoon around 14:00 pm EST, a service convoy started towing Atlantis from the runway back to Orbiter Processing Facility Bay 1.

The crew members flew back to NASA's Johnson Space Center in Houston on the following Saturday. On November 30, 2009, they received the traditional Houston homecoming celebration at nearby Ellington Field.

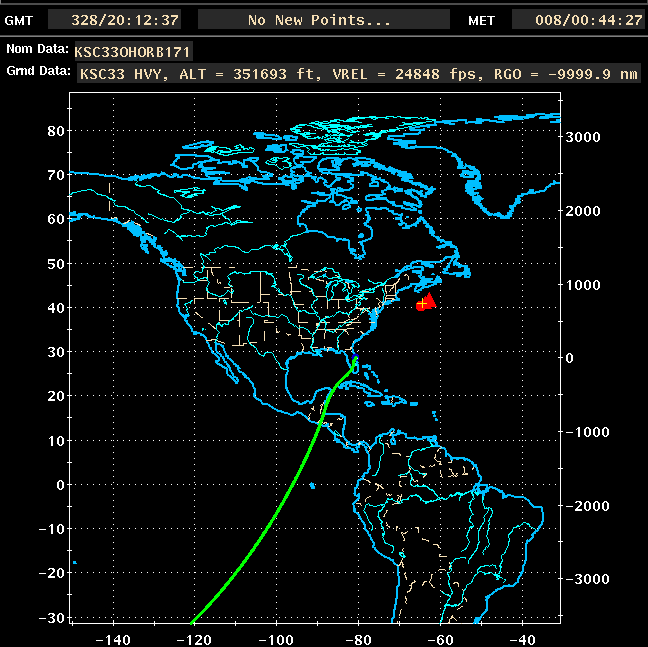
Landing Ground Track

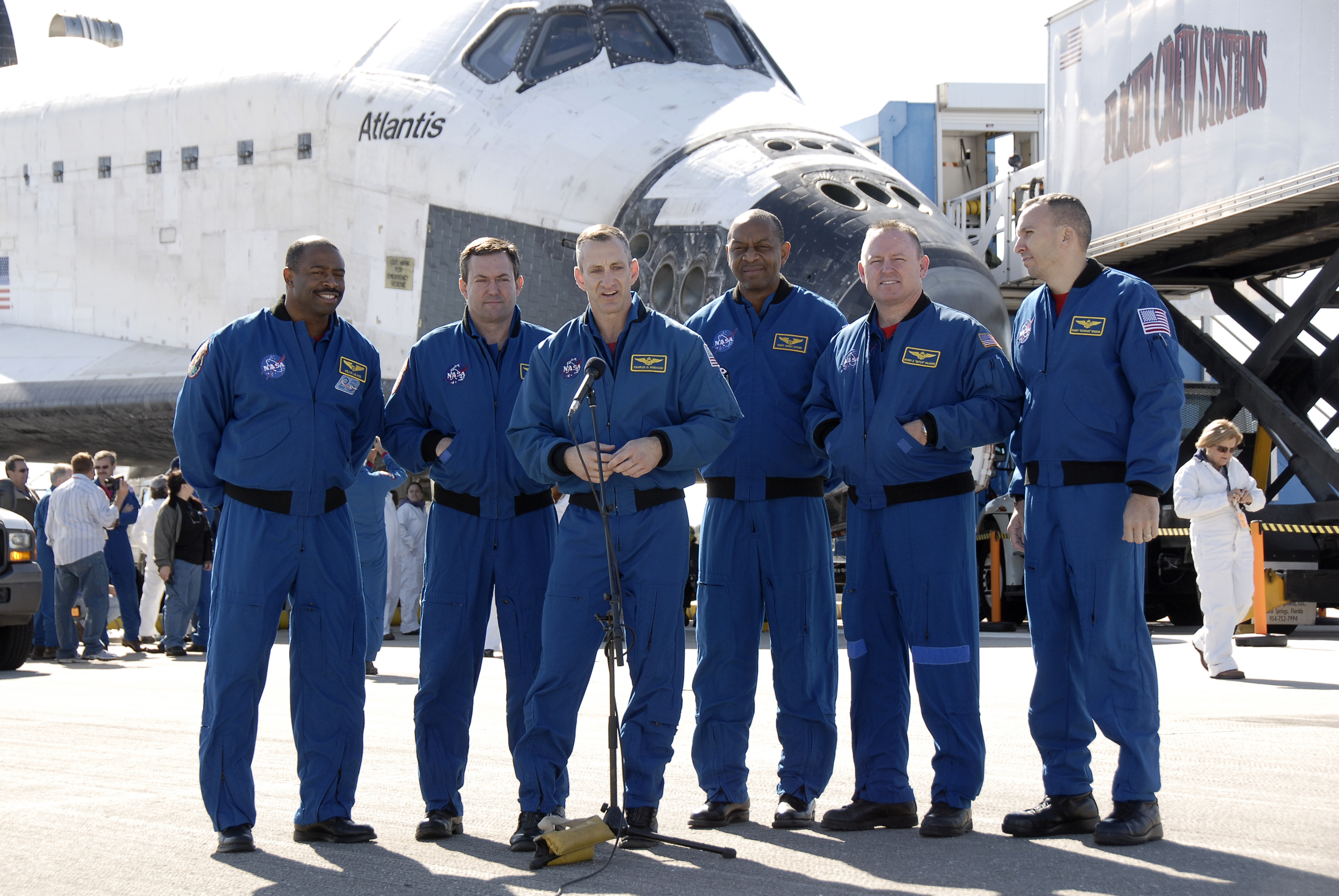
Commander Charles Hobaugh speaks on the tarmac

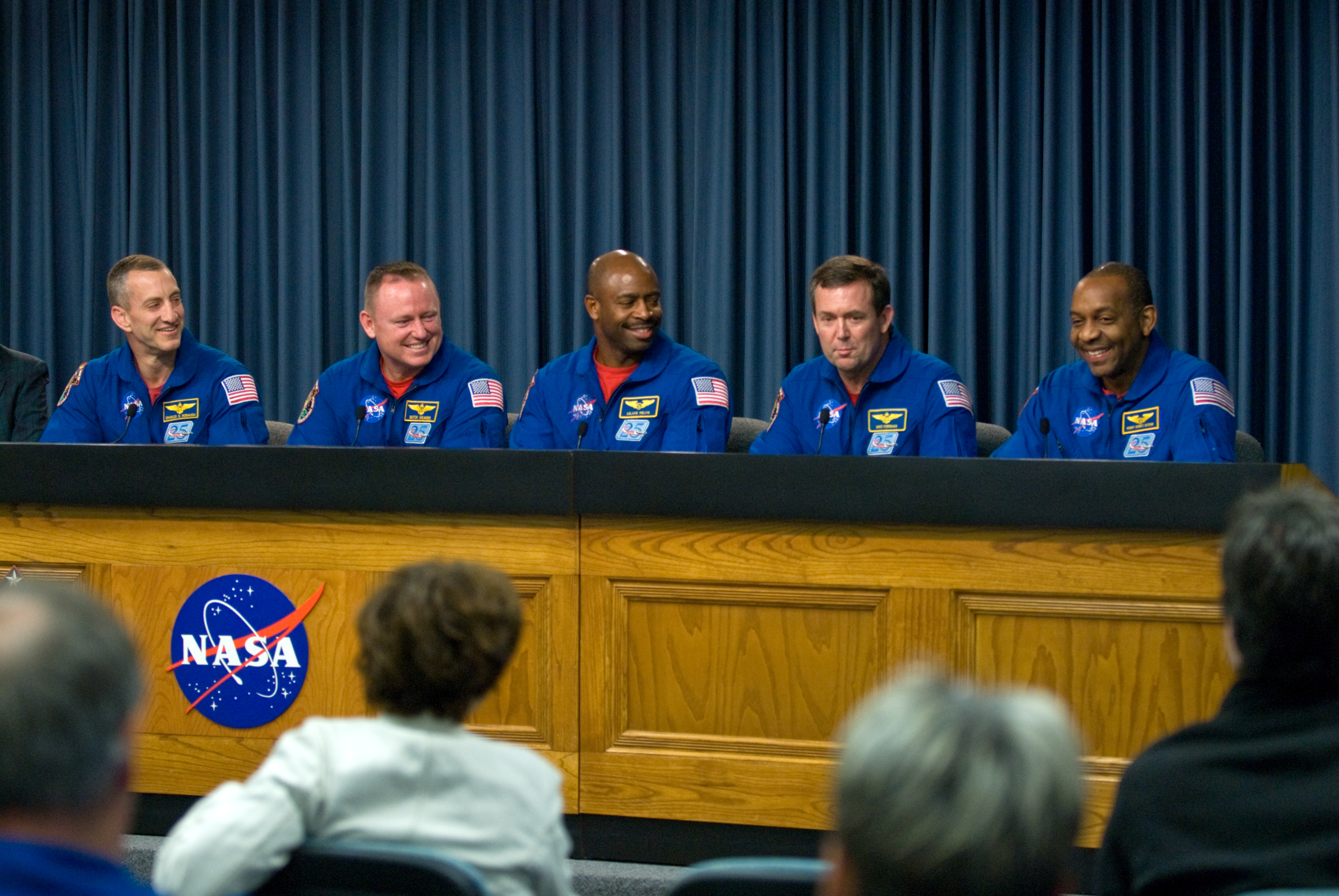
Post-landing crew conference

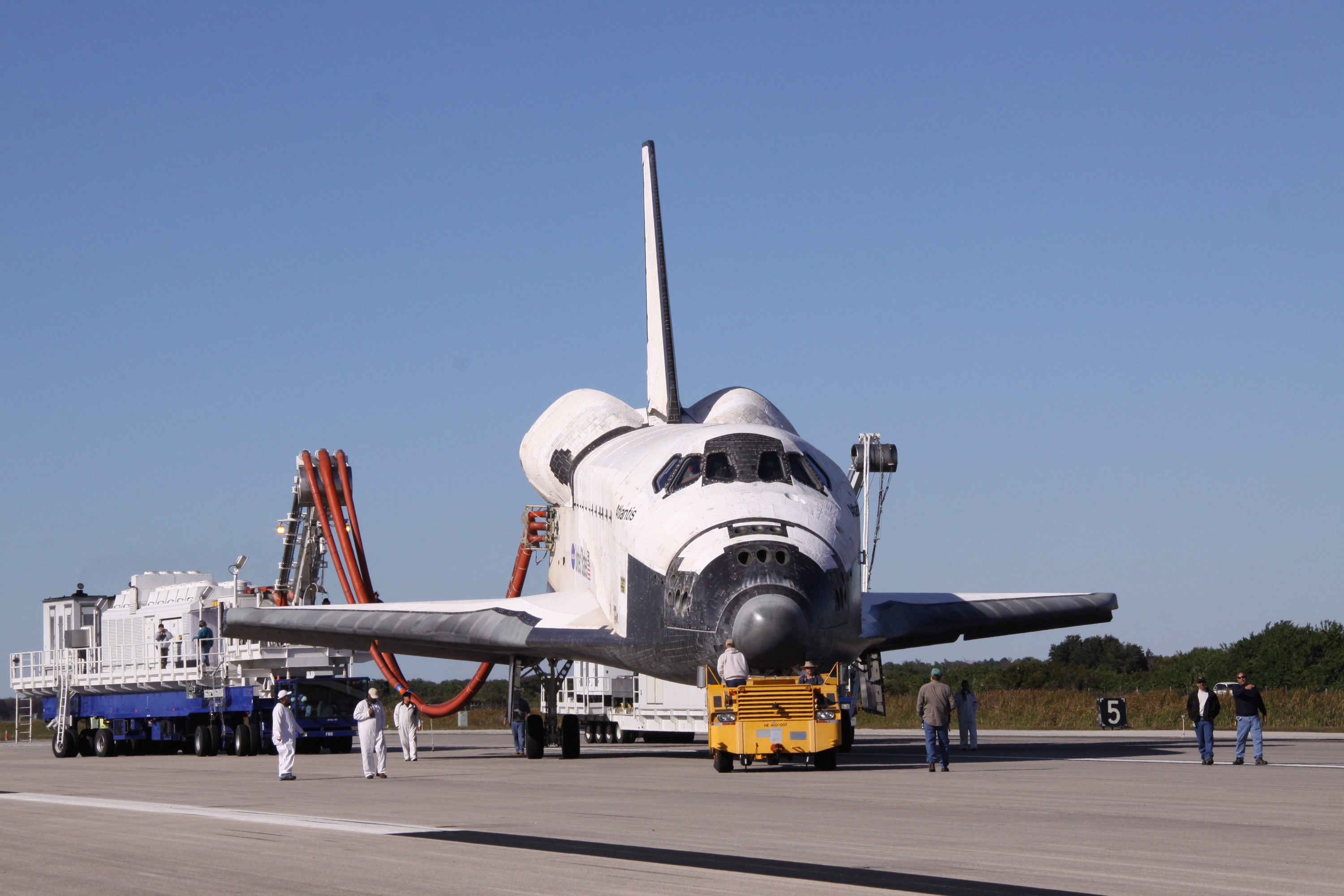
Atlantis is towed to Orbiter Processing Facility-1

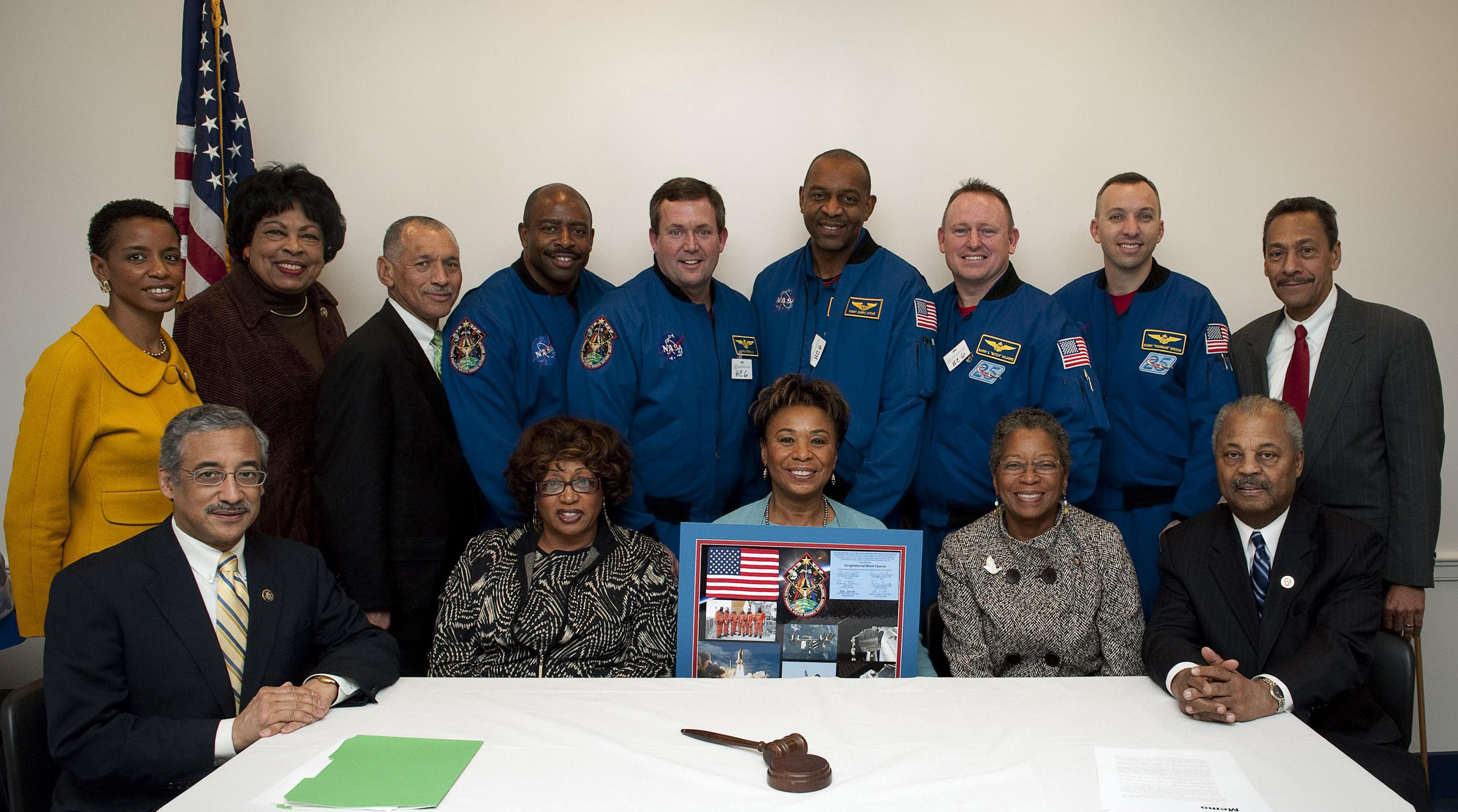
The crew meets with members of congress.

== Spacewalks ==
EVA	Spacewalkers	Start (UTC)	End (UTC)	Duration
EVA 1	Michael Foreman; Robert Satcher	November 19, 2009; 14:24 UTC	November 19, 2009; 21:01 UTC	6 hours, 37 minutes
EVA 1	Installed a spare antenna on the station's truss and a bracket for ammonia lines on the Unity module. They also lubricated the grapple mechanism on the Payload Orbital Replacement Unit Attachment Device on the Mobile Base System and lubricated the snares of the hand of the station's Japanese robotic arm. Deployed the S3 outboard Payload Attachment System.			
EVA 2	Michael Foreman; Randolph Bresnik	November 21, 2009; 14:31 UTC	November 21, 2009; 20:39 UTC	6 hours, 8 minutes
EVA 2	Installed the GATOR (Grappling Adaptor to On-Orbit Railing) bracket to the Columbus laboratory and an additional ham radio antenna. They also installed on the truss an antenna for wireless helmet camera video. They also relocated the Floating Potential Measurement Unit that records electrical potential around the station as it orbits the Earth and deployed two brackets to attach cargo on the truss.			
EVA 3	Robert Satcher; Randolph Bresnik	November 23, 2009; 13:24 UTC	November 23, 2009; 19:06 UTC	5 hours, 42 minutes
EVA 3	Satcher installed an oxygen filled new High Pressure Gas Tank (HPGT) on the Quest airlock. Bresnik got the next set of "Materials on International Space Station Experiment," known as MISSE-7A and 7B, out from Atlantis' cargo bay and installed on ELC-2, activated and checked out. The spacewalkers removed a pair of micrometeoroid and orbital debris (MMOD) shields from outside the airlock and strapped them to the External Stowage Platform #2. Bresnik relocated a foot restraint. Satcher released a bolt on an Ammonia Tank Assembly in preparation of a future spacewalk during STS-131, and installed insulated covers on cameras on the mobile servicing system and on Canadarm2's end effector. They worked the heater cables on a docking adapter in advance of the Tranquility module installation on Unity's port side.			

== Wake-up calls ==
NASA began a tradition of playing music to astronauts during the Gemini program, which was first used to wake up a flight crew during Apollo 15. Each track is specially chosen, often by their families, and usually has a special meaning to an individual member of the crew, or is applicable to their daily activities.

Flight Day	Song	Artist	Played for	Links
Day 2	"I Can Only Imagine"	MercyMe	Barry E. Wilmore	-
Day 3	"Higher Ground"	Stevie Wonder	Robert Satcher	-
Day 4	"In Wonder"	Newsboys	Randolph Bresnik	-
Day 5	"We Are Family"	Sister Sledge	Leland Melvin	-
Day 6	"Voyage to Atlantis"	The Isley Brothers	Robert Satcher	-
Day 7	"Butterfly Kisses"	Bob Carlisle	Randolph Bresnik celebrating the birth of his daughter, Abigail Mae Bresnik hours earlier	-
Day 8	"Space Rise"	Larry Whitehair	Michael Foreman	-
Day 9	"The Marine Corps Hymn"	The Marine Corps Band	Charles O. Hobaugh	-
Day 10	"Amazing Grace" from the 1995 movie Braveheart	Eric Rigler on bagpipes	Barry E. Wilmore	-
Day 11	"Fly Me to the Moon"	Frank Sinatra	Nicole Stott	-
Day 12	"Home Sweet Home"	Mötley Crüe	STS-129 Crew	-

== Mission insignia ==
The STS-129 mission patch was designed by Tim Gagnon and Dr. Jorge Cartes. The rather unusual shape of the patch resulted from the crew's desire for the patch to signify the mission's payload (two ExPRESS Logistics Carriers) providing equipment ensuring the longevity of the ISS.

The insignia incorporates a number of design elements not typically incorporated into a single patch: the Sun, Moon, Mars, NASA's astronaut symbol (ascending on red, white and blue stripes symbolizing the all-U.S. crew), the ISS, the Shuttle orbiter and the continental United States (representing the major U.S. centers supporting the Space Shuttle Program).

The 13 stars on the patch represent the crewmembers' children, and the Moon and Mars represent the future of space exploration. The names of the crew members are denoted on the outer band of the patch.

== See also ==
- 2009 in spaceflight
- List of human spaceflights
- List of International Space Station spacewalks
- List of Space Shuttle missions
- List of spacewalks 2000–2014
- List of African-American astronauts
