= STS-118 =

2007 American crewed spaceflight to the ISS

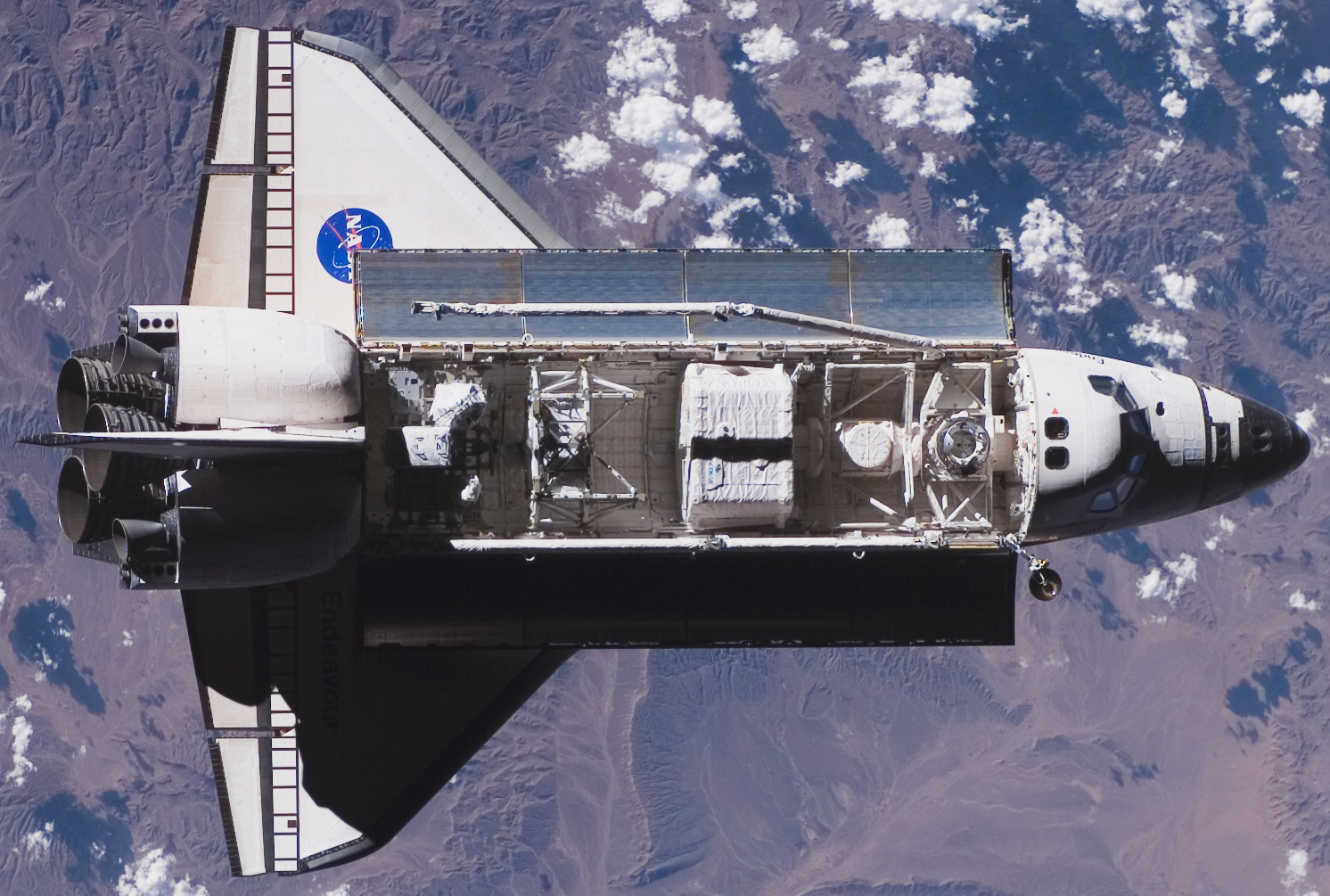
- Endeavour rendezvous with the ISS
- Names: Space Transportation System-118
- Mission type: ISS assembly
- Operator: NASA
- COSPAR ID: 2007-035A
- SATCAT no.: 32008
- Mission duration: 12 days, 17 hours, 55 minutes, 34 seconds
- Distance travelled: 8,489,253 kilometres (5,274,977 mi)
- Orbits completed: 201

Spacecraft properties
- Spacecraft: Space Shuttle Endeavour
- Launch mass: 121,823 kilograms (268,574 lb)
- Landing mass: 100,878 kilograms (222,398 lb)
- Payload mass: 20,945kg (46,180 lb)

Crew
- Crew size: 7
- Members: Scott Kelly; Charles O. Hobaugh; Tracy Caldwell; Richard Mastracchio; Dafydd Williams; Barbara Morgan; Alvin Drew

Start of mission
- Launch date: August 8, 2007, 22:36:42 UTC
- Launch site: Kennedy, LC-39A

End of mission
- Landing date: August 21, 2007, 16:33:20 UTC
- Landing site: Kennedy, SLF Runway 15

Orbital parameters
- Reference system: Geocentric
- Regime: Low Earth
- Perigee altitude: 226 kilometers (140 mi)
- Apogee altitude: 226 kilometers (140 mi)
- Inclination: 51.6 degrees
- Period: 91.6 minutes

Docking with ISS
- Docking port: PMA-2 (Destiny forward)
- Docking date: August 10, 2007, 18:02 UTC
- Undocking date: August 19, 2007, 11:56 UTC
- Time docked: 8 days, 17 hours, 54 minutes
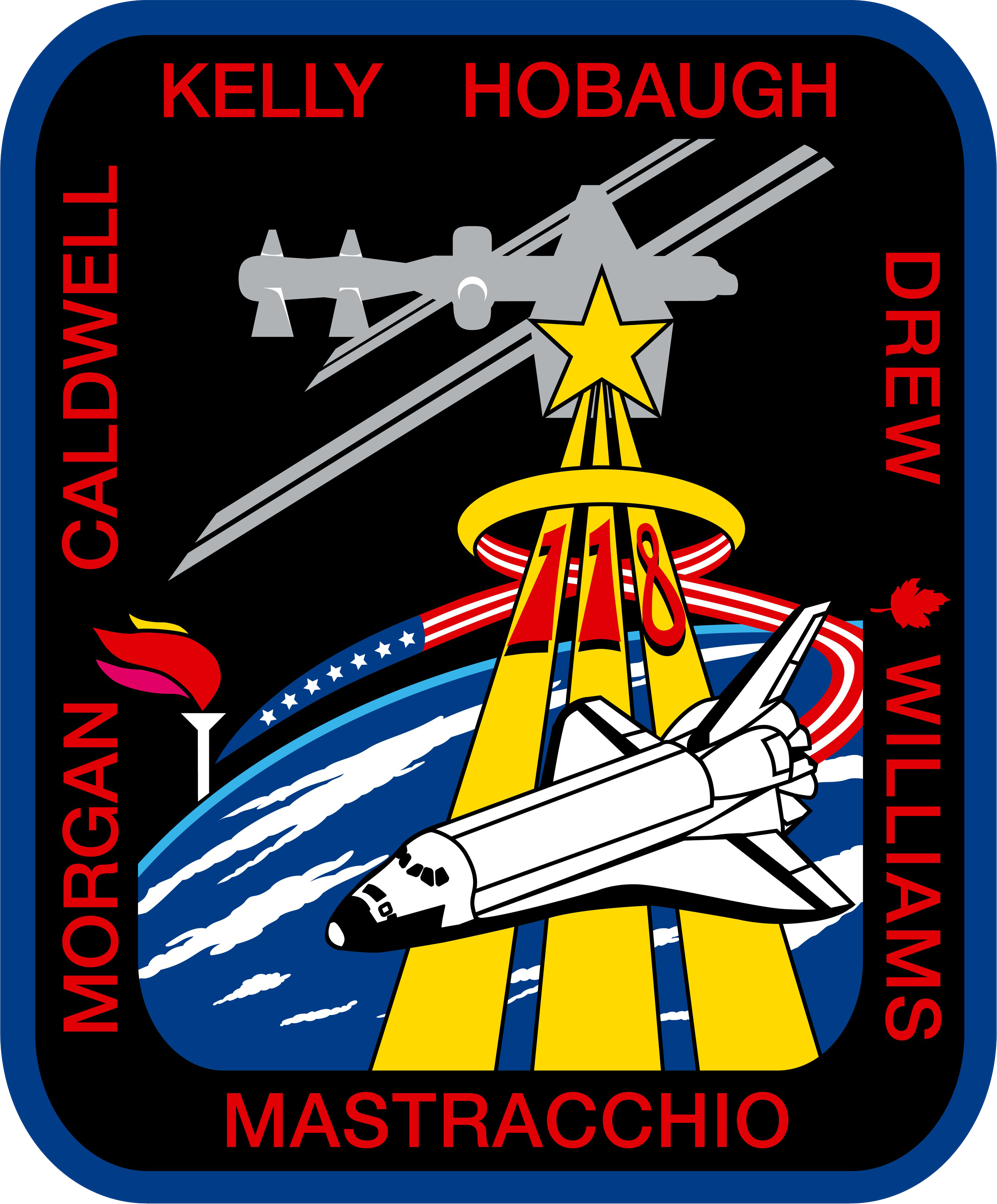
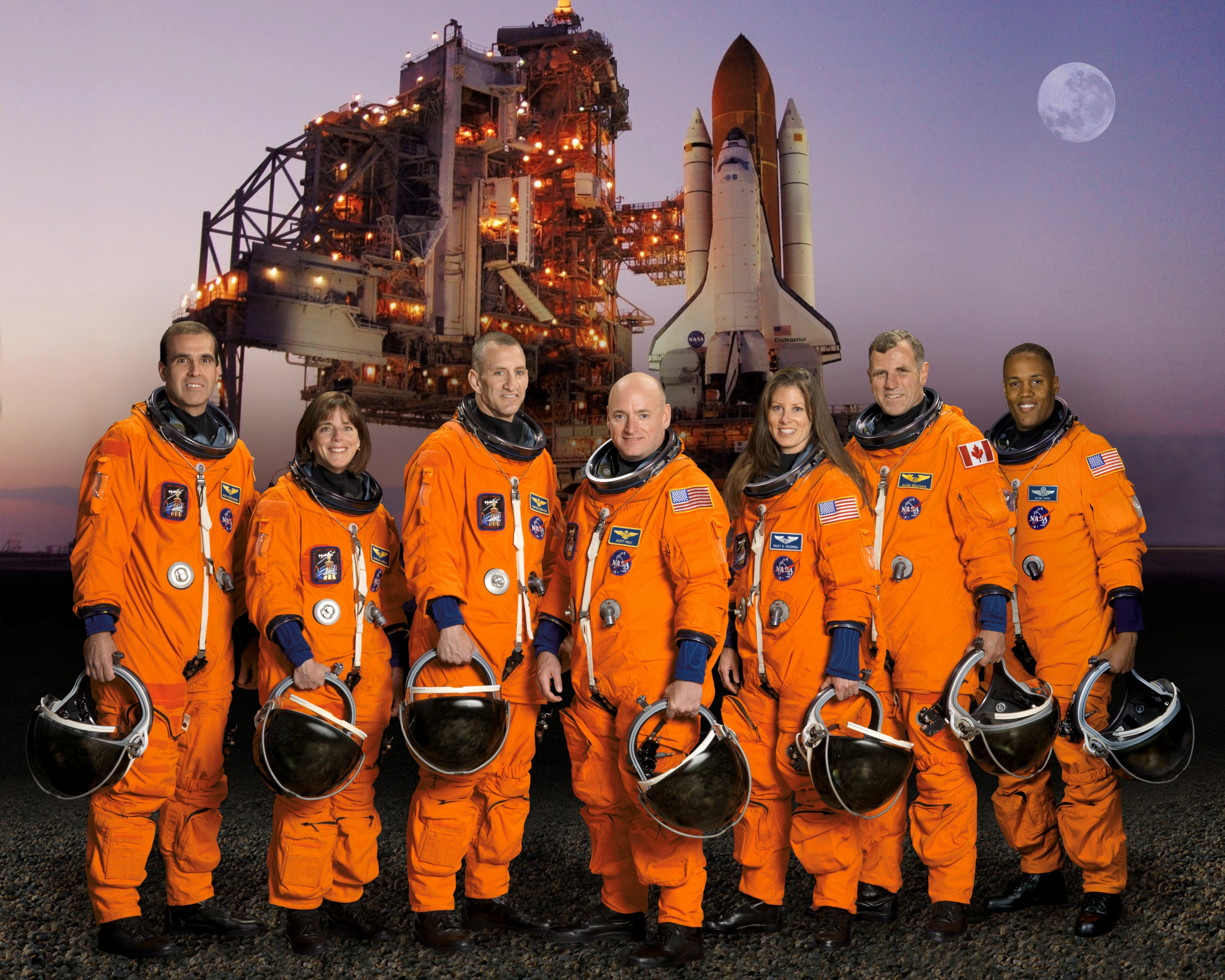
- (left to right) Mastracchio, Morgan, Hobaugh, Kelly, Caldwell, Williams and Drew. Space Shuttle program

STS-118 was a Space Shuttle mission to the International Space Station (ISS) flown by the orbiter Endeavour. STS-118 lifted off on August 8, 2007, from launch pad 39A at Kennedy Space Center (KSC), Florida and landed at the Shuttle Landing Facility at KSC on August 21, 2007.

This was the first flight of Endeavour since STS-113 in November 2002, which was also the last successful shuttle flight before STS-107, which culminated in the loss of Columbia when it disintegrated during reentry. STS-118 pilot Charles Hobaugh had been the entry team CAPCOM for STS-107. Columbia had originally been selected for this flight, for what would have been its 29th mission, and its first and likely only visit to the ISS, mainly due to its heavier weight.

The mission is also referred to as ISS-13A.1 by the ISS program. The mission added two more components to the ISS and brought supplies for its crew.

During and after the mission, the media focused heavily on a small puncture in the heat shield, created by a piece of insulation foam that came off the external tank during liftoff, though the foam impact that ultimately destroyed Columbia caused more damage and was in a critical area. KSC Launch Director Michael D. Leinbach mentioned in the post-flight news conference that upon initial inspection on the ground, "Endeavour appears to be the 'cleanest' post-flight orbiter since Return to Flight". On August 31, 2007, NASA reported that the damaged tiles had been removed in the Orbiter Processing Facility, and engineers had found no evidence of heat-related damage to the orbiter itself.

== Crew ==
| Position | Astronaut |
|---|---|
| Commander | (United States) Scott Kelly; Second spaceflight |
| Pilot | (United States) Charles O. Hobaugh; Second spaceflight |
| Mission Specialist 1 | (United States) Tracy Caldwell; First spaceflight |
| Mission Specialist 2 Flight Engineer | (United States) Richard Mastracchio; Second spaceflight |
| Mission Specialist 3 | (Canada) Dafydd Williams, CSA; Second and last spaceflight |
| Mission Specialist 4 | (United States) Barbara Morgan; Only spaceflight |
| Mission Specialist 5 | (United States) Alvin Drew; First spaceflight |

=== Crew notes ===
Astronaut Clayton Anderson was originally slated to be launched to the ISS on this mission, but was moved to STS-117. His replacement was Alvin Drew.

NASA press releases and media briefing documents stated that STS-118 was the first flight of a Mission Specialist Educator due to the presence of Barbara Morgan. The Educator Astronaut Project is the successor to NASA's Teacher in Space Project, which ended with the Space Shuttle Challenger disaster in 1986. The official STS-118 mission patch included a flame of knowledge that represented the importance of education, and honored teachers and students everywhere. Morgan was the backup to Christa McAuliffe, the teacher who was killed aboard Challenger in 1986 on STS-51-L mission 73 seconds after lifted off. The tip of the flames touched Morgan's name on the patch. Nonetheless, NASA Administrator Michael D. Griffin clarified at a post-mission press conference that Morgan was not considered a mission specialist educator, but rather a standard mission specialist, who had once been a teacher.

Prior to the Columbia disaster, the crew manifest for STS-118 was:

| Position | Astronaut |
|---|---|
| Commander | Scott J. Kelly; Second spaceflight |
| Pilot | Charles O. Hobaugh; Second spaceflight |
| Mission Specialist 1 | Scott E. Parazynski; Fifth spaceflight |
| Mission Specialist 2 Flight Engineer | Lisa Nowak; First spaceflight |
| Mission Specialist 3 | Dafydd Williams, CSA; Second spaceflight |
| Mission Specialist 4 | Barbara Morgan; First spaceflight |
Parazynski was assigned to STS-120 and Nowak was assigned to STS-121.

== Mission payloads ==
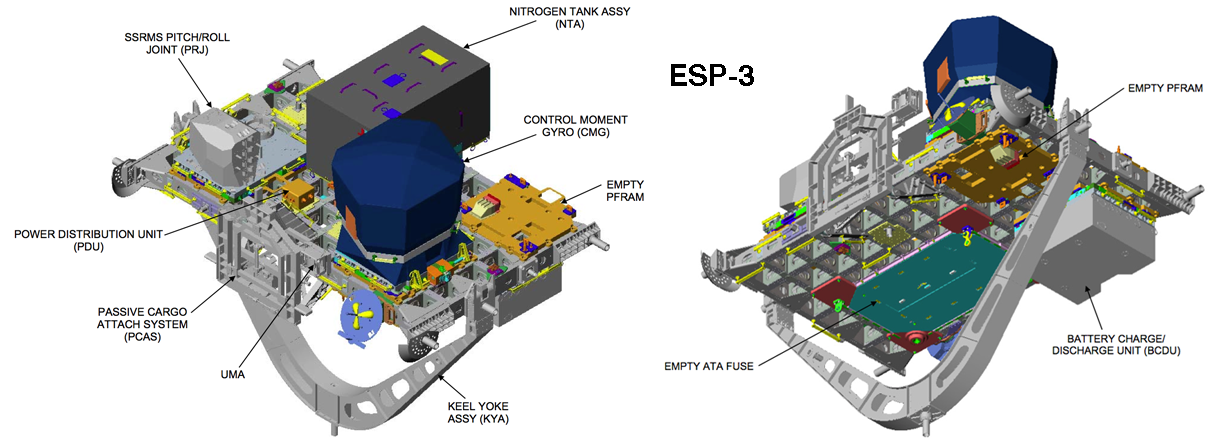
ESP-3 launch configuration

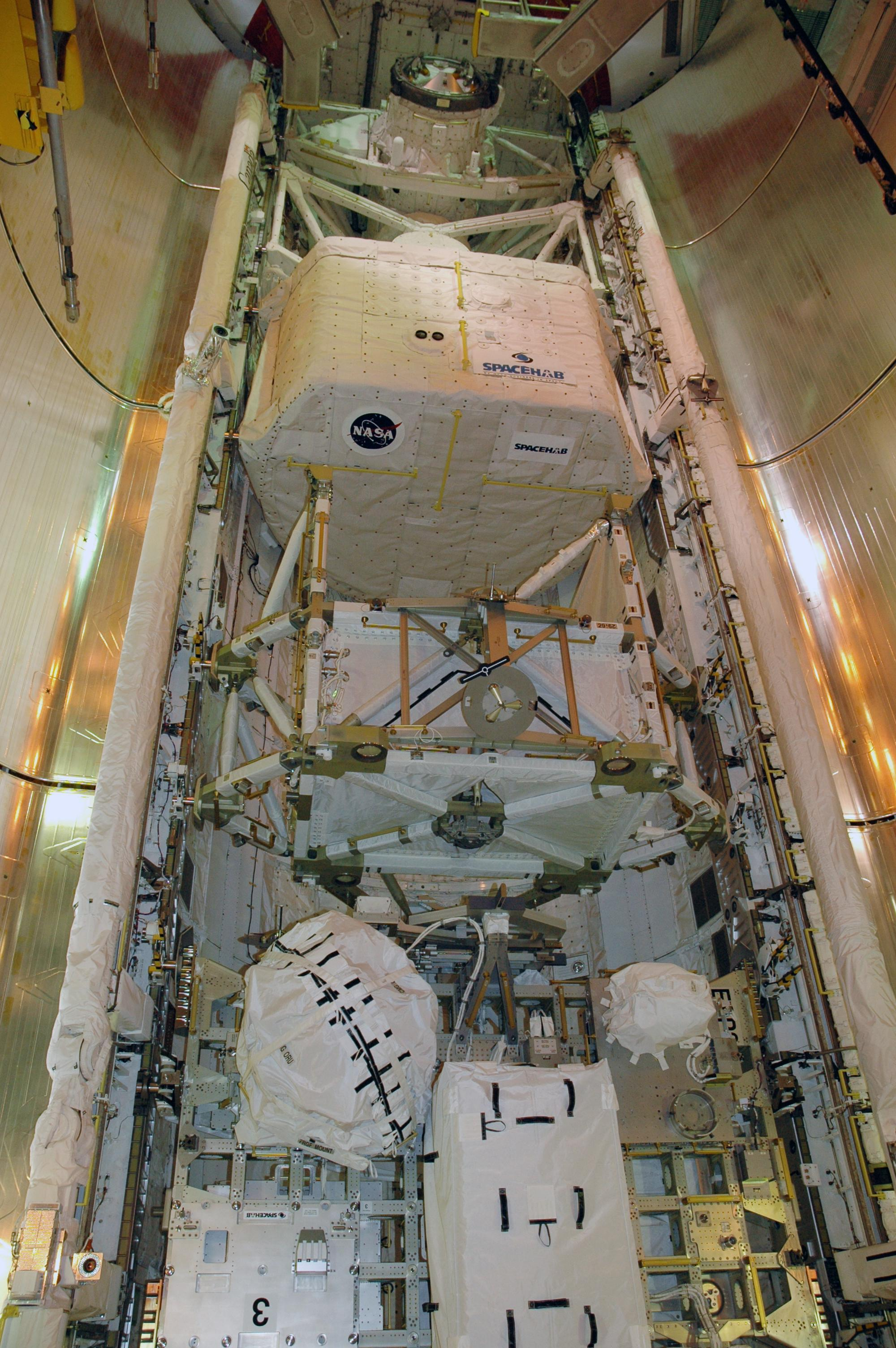
From top to bottom: Orbiter docking system, Spacehab, S5 truss, ESP-3. The CMG is the globe bottom left.

The STS-118 mission delivered and assembled the starboard S5 truss segment of the International Space Station, as well as External Stowage Platform 3, (ESP-3) and a replacement Control Moment Gyroscope (CMG). The mission was also the final flight to include the Spacehab Logistics Single Module.

The Spacehab Logistics Single Module, a pressurized aluminum habitat that is carried inside the payload bay, has a capacity of 6,000 pounds (2,700 kg), and carried a variety of cargo and research projects, including supply materials for the ISS. It returned cargo, including the MISSE PEC 3 & 4, a Department of Defense payload that had been installed on the ISS. Launched in July 2006, the MISSE PEC-3 and 4 contained over 850 materials specimens that will be studied to determine the effects of long-term exposure to the environment of space.

| Location | Cargo | Mass |
|---|---|---|
| Bay 1–2 | Orbiter Docking System; EMU 3010 / EMU 3017 | 1,800 kilograms (4,000 lb)? |
| Bay 3 | Tunnel Adapter | 112 kilograms (247 lb) |
| Bay 5–7 | Spacehab-SM | 5,480 kilograms (12,080 lb)? |
| Bay 8P | Shuttle Power; Distribution Unit (SPDU) | ?0 kilograms (0 lb) |
| Bay 8–10 | Truss Segment S5 | 1,584 kilograms (3,492 lb) |
| Bay 11–12 | ESP-3 | 3,400 kilograms (7,500 lb) |
| Sill | OBSS | 450 kilograms (990 lb)? |
| Sill | RMS 201 | 390 kilograms (860 lb) |
| | Total: | 14,036 kilograms (30,944 lb) |

=== Crew seat assignments ===
| Seat | Launch | Landing | Seats 1–4 are on the flight deck. Seats 5–7 are on the mid-deck. |
| 1 | Kelly | | Seats 1–4 are on the flight deck. Seats 5–7 are on the mid-deck. |
| 2 | Hobaugh | | Seats 1–4 are on the flight deck. Seats 5–7 are on the mid-deck. |
| 3 | Caldwell | Morgan | Seats 1–4 are on the flight deck. Seats 5–7 are on the mid-deck. |
| 4 | Mastracchio | | Seats 1–4 are on the flight deck. Seats 5–7 are on the mid-deck. |
| 5 | Williams | | Seats 1–4 are on the flight deck. Seats 5–7 are on the mid-deck. |
| 6 | Morgan | Caldwell | Seats 1–4 are on the flight deck. Seats 5–7 are on the mid-deck. |
| 7 | Drew | | Seats 1–4 are on the flight deck. Seats 5–7 are on the mid-deck. |

== Mission background ==
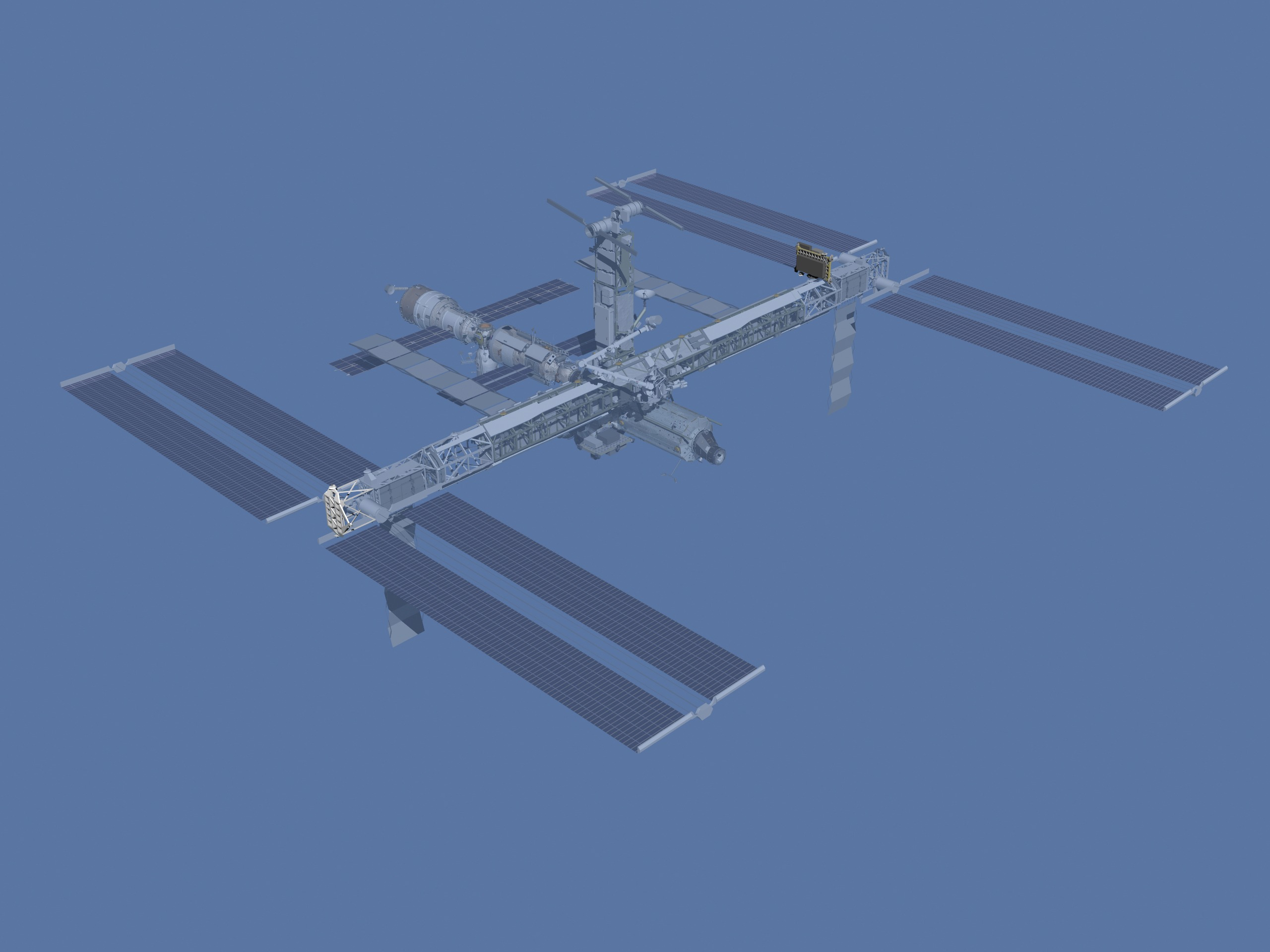
New components added to the International Space Station after flight STS-118/13A.1. (NASA)

The mission was originally scheduled to be flown by Columbia; STS-118 would have marked that orbiter's 29th flight and its first visit to the International Space Station. The Space Shuttle Columbia disaster altered the planned flight schedules, however, and the mission was rescheduled for Endeavour. STS-118 served as Endeavour's return to flight after a planned orbiter re-fit and maintenance period that resulted in over 200 modifications to the orbiter.

One of the most important modifications that debuted during STS-118 was an upgraded power-distribution module, the Station-Shuttle Power Transfer System (SSPTS). SSPTS allows Endeavour to tap into the ISS power supply, converting up to eight kilowatts of electrical power from 120-volts direct-current (120VDC) ISS main voltage to the 28VDC system used by the orbiter. SSPTS was outfitted to the ISS Pressurized Mating Adapter-2 (PMA2) during STS-116. These upgrades will allow orbiters to remain docked at the station for an additional three to four mission days by saving cryogenic liquid hydrogen and oxygen needed to run the fuel cells that generate electricity aboard the orbiter; oxygen and hydrogen tank capacity is a major factor limiting the duration of orbiter free flights. Other systems debuting on this flight were a three-string GPS system, which replaces the three Tactical Air Navigation-units, used to guide the shuttle and calculate its position during reentry and landing and the new Advanced Health Management System, which keeps an eye on the three main engines (SSMEs) during liftoff and will shut them down before any catastrophic damage might develop. (All SSMEs had their own computers to regulate, monitor, and shut them down in case of trouble; the new system extends and improves the monitoring capability for increased safety.) Endeavour also received several systems that the other orbiters had already been equipped with, such as a glass cockpit, improved wing leading-edge sensors and the OBSS.

STS-118 included mission specialist Barbara Morgan, the first mission specialist educator. Morgan trained as the backup to Christa McAuliffe, NASA's Teacher in Space candidate from 1985 to 1986. McAuliffe was killed in the Space Shuttle Challenger disaster on January 28, 1986. While McAuliffe and Morgan were classified as spaceflight participants and not as mission specialists in 1986, after the Teacher in Space Project was canceled, Morgan assumed the duties of Teacher in Space Designee and continued to work with NASA's Education Division until her selection as NASA's first mission specialist educator in 1998. Morgan completed two years of training and evaluation and began official duties in 2000. An Educator Astronaut is a fully trained astronaut who performs all the same duties that a regular astronaut does. Morgan became the first mission specialist educator in space on STS-118, and will share what she learned from the experience with students during and after her flight.

Whether you're teaching school, or whether you're training as an astronaut, you put all you can into it, and get the most out of it.

— Barbara Morgan

The mission marked:

- 150th crewed US space launch
- 119th Space Shuttle flight
- 22nd International Space Station assembly mission
- 20th flight of Endeavour
- 94th Post-Challenger mission
- 6th Post-Columbia mission
- First flight with SSPTS

== Mission timeline ==
=== Launch preparations ===
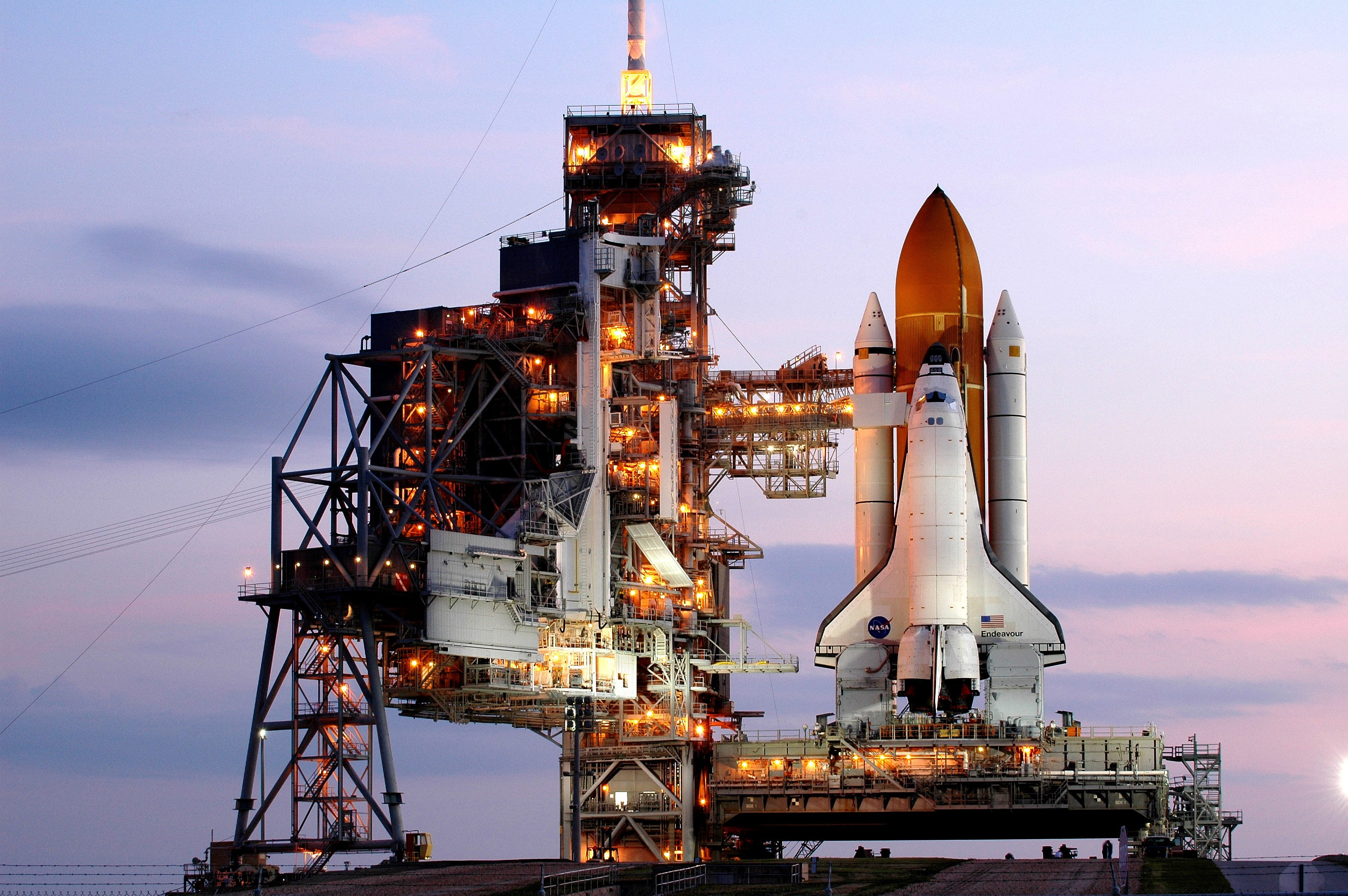
Space Shuttle Endeavour arrives at launch pad 39A.

Endeavour (OV-105) was moved from the Orbiter Processing Facility, bay OPF-2 to the Vehicle Assembly Building on July 2, 2007. On July 10, 2007, Endeavour moved from the Vehicle Assembly Building to Launch Pad 39A. Moving at less than one mile per hour (1.6 kilometres (0.99 mi)/h) atop the crawler-transporter, the move began at 20:10 EDT, and was "hard down" (secured in place at the pad) at 03:02 EDT, July 11, 2007.

The crew completed the terminal countdown demonstration test on July 19, 2007, and the Flight Readiness Review meetings were held on July 25–26, 2007, after which NASA managers declared STS-118 a "GO" for launch. The launch was delayed one day to repair a valve in the shuttle's crew cabin pressurization system.

Commander Kelly and the crew arrived at Kennedy Space Center on August 3, 2007, for final launch preparations. The countdown clock began at 20:00 EDT August 5, 2007, for the launch at 18:36 EDT on August 8, 2007.

=== Wednesday August 8 (Flight day 1, Launch) ===
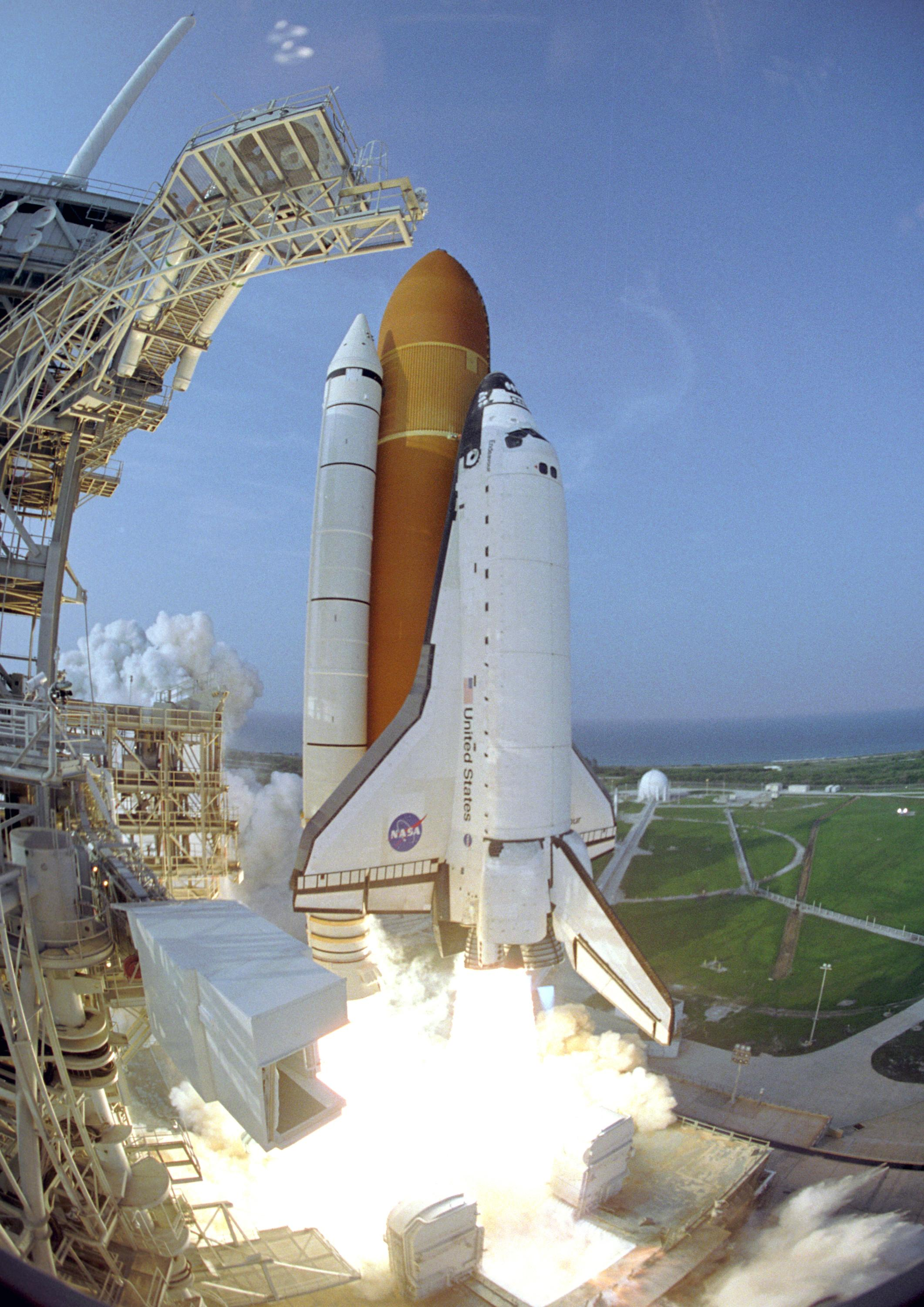
Launch of STS-118.

Fueling of the external tank began at 08:11 EDT (12:11 UTC) and finished around 11:00 EDT. The Ice Team began their inspection of the orbiter to ensure no ice was on the orbiter or the fuel tank, something unlikely due to the unusually warm conditions as launch time approached. Their inspection concluded about 40 minutes quicker than the usual two-hour duration. The crew departed for the Operations & Checkout (O&C) building, for the launch pad at 14:46 EDT (18:46 UTC), and arrived at the pad at 15:02 EDT (19:02 UTC). Launch occurred at 18:36:42 EDT (22:36:42 UTC).

Countdown and launch notes:

- The Ice Team members discovered a small crack in the foam surrounding the external fuel tank during their preflight examination. After a review by the Mission Management Team, it was concluded that there was no debris issue regarding the crack, and the tank was safe to fly.
- A problem with the switches associated with the crew hatch required a second and third hatch closure attempt. Hatch closure was completed and verified at 17:23 EDT (21:23 UTC).
- The high-definition video camera used to inspect the shuttle from Kennedy Space Center during launch failed prior to liftoff. The launch team decided that the cameras on the external tank and the orbiter would be sufficient for observations, and went on to launch without it.
- The final forecast predicted 80% go for launch weather.
- Launch Director Mike Leinbach conducted his T-9 poll, and declared Endeavour a "go" for launch at 18:26 EDT (22:26 UTC).
- Liftoff occurred at 18:36:42 EDT. (22:36:42 UTC)
- Solid Rocket Boosters successfully separated at 18:39 EDT (22:39 UTC).
- Main Engine Cutoff occurred at 18:45:30 EDT (22:45:30 UTC)
- External Tank separation occurred at 18:45:45 EDT (22:45:45 UTC)

The primary TAL site was Zaragoza Airport in Spain.

Following the procedures for post-ascent, the crew opened the payload bay doors, activated the Spacehab, powered up the Remote Manipulator System, and performed a variety of other payload activation procedures, before entering their scheduled sleep shift at 04:36 UTC (00:36 EDT) August 9, 2007.

=== Thursday August 9 (Flight day 2) ===
The shuttle crew spent most of the day inspecting the outer hull and the heat shield. During the mission status briefing, Deputy Shuttle Program Manager (and Mission Management Team chairman) John Shannon reported that during launch, approximately nine pieces of foam were observed breaking off the external fuel tanks. Three of these struck the shuttle. All three strikes are considered to be minor in nature.

=== Friday August 10 (Flight day 3) ===
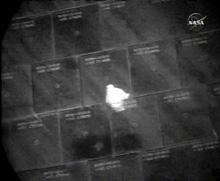
Preliminary image of damage to the thermal protective tiles.

Endeavour successfully docked with the International Space Station at 18:02 UTC (14:02 EDT). Approximately an hour before docking, Endeavour performed the one-degree-per-second backflip, called the Rendezvous Pitch Maneuver (RPM), so the ISS crew members could take digital pictures of the heat shield of the orbiter. The images were then analyzed by NASA's Image Analysis Team, as well as the Mission Management Team to inspect the integrity of the orbiter's heat shield. Following a series of leak checks, the hatches were opened at 20:04 UTC (16:04 EDT), and the Expedition 15 crew welcomed the STS-118 crew aboard the station.

After preliminary review of the photos taken by the Expedition 15 crew during the RPM, an area of interest was discovered on the underside of the Shuttle; an area behind the right landing gear door covered with black silica tiles. The tile directly aft of the door had a 3.5 inches (8.9 cm) by 2 inches (5.1 cm) gouge in it. While the tile was penetrated, the underlying felt backing was not. NASA noted in the press conference that launch-time video confirmed a foam strike. This area is less critical than the leading-edge reinforced carbon-carbon tiles that were damaged in the Space Shuttle Columbia disaster, but did cause concern for the Mission Management Team. A focused inspection was scheduled for August 12, 2007, to determine whether a patch attempt would be undertaken by the astronauts during an EVA. NASA once reported that pieces of foam are bound to, and have fallen off of the external tank during the eight and a-half-minute ride to orbit. An unprecedented 300 pieces of foam once struck the underside of an orbiter during launch.

The crew activated the Station-to-Shuttle Power Transfer System (SSPTS) after docking. The SSPTS transfers electrical power from the station to the shuttle, allowing the shuttle to conserve its own power generating resources. An extension of the mission from 11 to 14 days was dependent on proper operation of the SSPTS.

=== Saturday August 11 (Flight day 4) ===
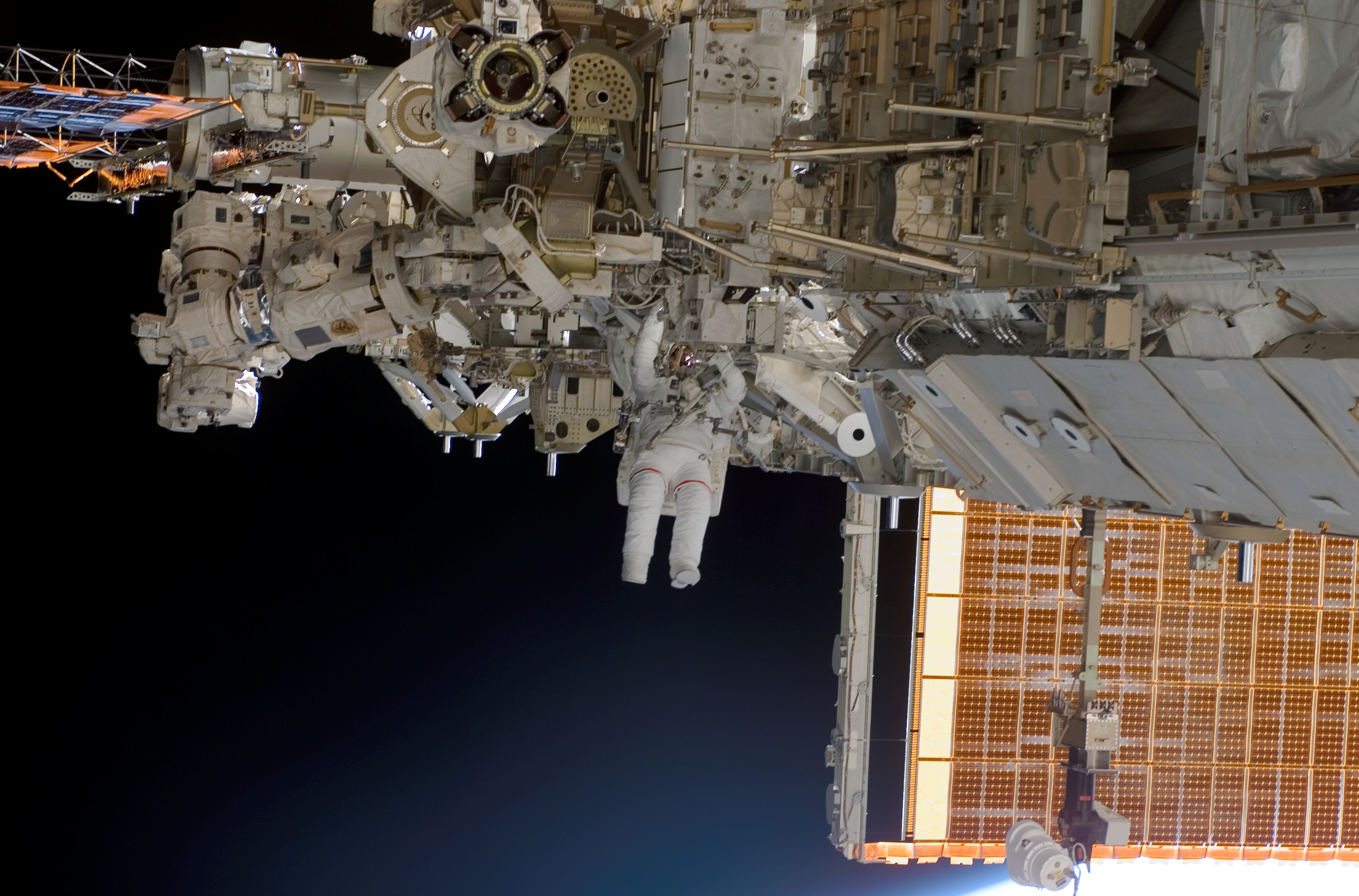
Astronaut Rick Mastracchio works on the outside of the International Space Station during EVA 1 on August 11.

At 21:45 (UTC), Rick Mastracchio and Dave Williams started the first EVA of the mission, installing the S5 truss to the station, increasing the total mass of the ISS to 232,693 kilograms (513,000 lb). The EVA duration was 6 hours and 17 minutes, and all objectives were successfully completed.

During the Mission Status press conference, Lead ISS Flight Director Joel Montalbano reported that the SSPTS was working well, and the recommendation to the Mission Management Team will be to extend the mission to the planned 14-day mission.

Mission Management Team chair John Shannon reported after additional analysis, it appeared that a piece of foam came off the external tank in the area of the tank's feed line, and bounced off a nearby strut, resulting in a hit to the orbiter's underside. An almost identical section of foam was lost on STS-115, but did not strike the orbiter. John reported after further review of photos taken on flight day three, they do not feel the damage went all the way through the tile, but focused inspection is still planned for flight day five, and decisions would not be made until more information is obtained. Five specific areas will be inspected during focused inspection, and with the data gathered, thermal testing can be done to determine what actions, if any, need to be taken.

Overall, John Shannon classified the foam loss as a "concern", but only with regard to the history that the specific area has with regard to foam loss in past missions. Shannon reported that analysis would be complete by flight day 7 at the latest.

John Shannon also reported that the possible protruding gap filler noticed on flight day 3, was reviewed further, and was determined to be "shim stock", which will burn off in the upper atmosphere, and poses no issues for re-entry.

=== Sunday August 12 (Flight day 5) ===
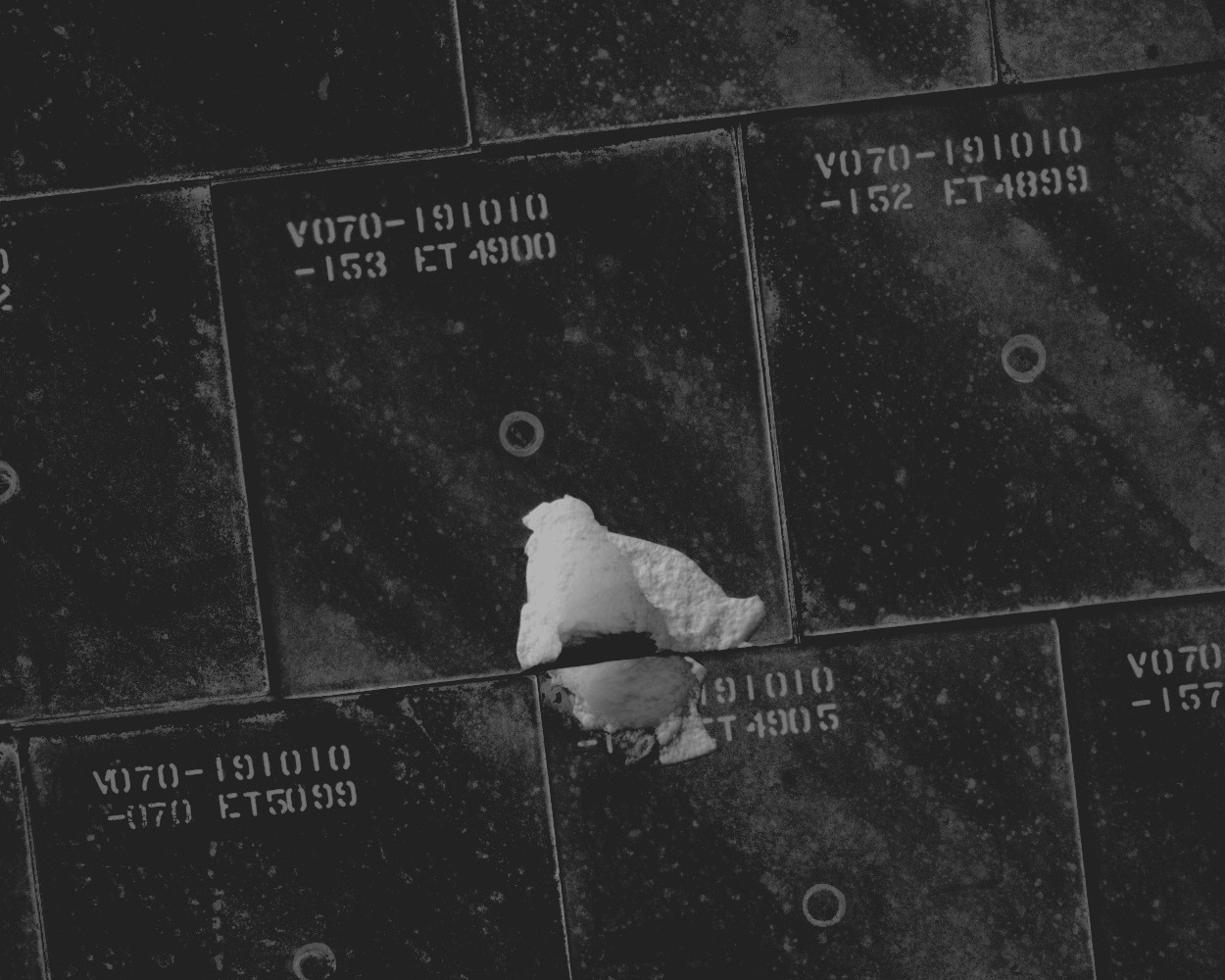
High resolution image of thermal protective tiles taken during focused inspection on flight day five.

The crew carried out the focused inspection without any problems, and at 20:56 (UTC), the crews of Endeavour and Expedition 15 were notified that the SSPTS was working as expected, and the mission was officially extended to the planned 14-day mission. Commander Scott Kelly replied, "That's great news, thanks".

In the daily mission status briefing, Lead Flight Director Matt Abbott announced the official extension of the mission, that the SSPTS was working as planned, and they were pleased with the data gathered during the focused inspection on Sunday. Mission Management Team Chairman John Shannon confirmed the decision of the Mission Management Team to extend the mission to 14 days, and to add a fourth EVA, was unanimous. He noted that the addition of SSPTS will be a valuable new tool, providing not only extended missions, but also the ability to provide the space station with additional supplies of oxygen, water, and other resources.

Shannon reported on the focused inspection, confirming that good laser data and imagery was obtained, and they resolved several areas of interest, classifying them as of no concern. One area of interest was two adjacent thermal plates on the shuttle's underside that had a gouge that appeared to be deeper than would allow them to rule it out. NASA would use data from the focused inspection to model the area, and do thermal analysis of the area. They will use the data to mimic the damage with sample tiles at Johnson Space Center, and using a variety of testing methods, possible courses of action would then be evaluated. No decision would be made until all data had been received and reviewed.

Shannon did report that following STS-118, NASA will do a thorough review of the history of foam loss from the area of the external tank since STS-114, analysis and testing would be done, and any speculation as to a future course of action would not be made until all the information was available.

=== Monday August 13 (Flight day 6) ===
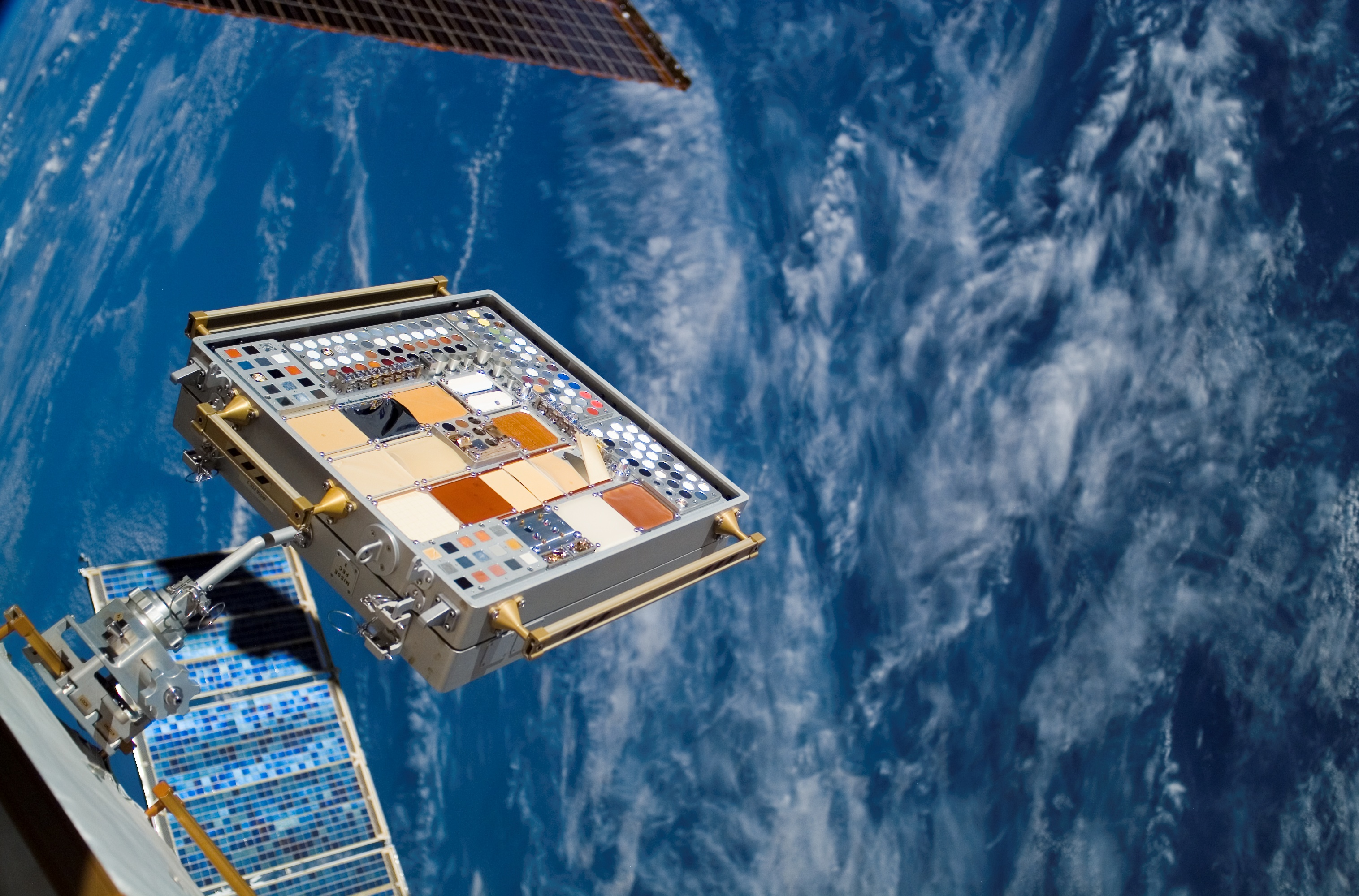
One of the retrieved MISSE experiments.

Rick Mastracchio and Dave Williams completed the mission's second spacewalk, successfully achieving all of the scheduled activities. During the EVA, they removed a new CMG from Endeavour's payload bay, and moved it to the Z1 truss, where they removed the failed CMG. After installing the new CMG, they placed the failed CMG on an external stowage platform, where it will remain until it is returned to Earth with mission STS-122. After initial testing on the ground, NASA reported the new CMG was functioning normally.

During the EVA, Mastracchio reported an EVA suit alarm, indicating high levels of CO_{2}, but after reviewing all indicators and sensors, NASA confirmed it was an instrumentation issue, and the suit itself was fine. At the mission status briefing, NASA reported the suit would be used on future spacewalks, and the issue was not of any concern.

During the Mission Management briefing, John Shannon discussed Endeavour's heat shield and re-entry issues. He reported that after initial modeling they believe the majority of heating will be on the backside of the gouge, and not into the filler bar side, which was the preferable situation. He reiterated that it was a complicated aerodynamic shape, and they wanted to be sure the flow would concentrate in the back "well" of the hole. The engineers and analysts would continue to do additional flow modeling, after which they would take the data into the arc jet testing facility for additional analysis. The first preliminary arc jet tests would be performed Monday night.

Shannon reported a "team four" had been assembled, along with the operations and engineering teams, to assist in data analysis. The teams will look at options for repair if required, and make recommendations to the Mission Management Team after the analysis of tests and data. Shannon stated he had no doubt that if a repair was required, the crew could execute it without significant impact to the mission timeline. He reiterated that this was not a catastrophic damage situation, but simply a situation that they would prefer to fix if possible, similar to the OMS blanket issue during STS-117 in June 2007.

There are three different on-orbit repair techniques available to the crew. Both post-Columbia Return to Flight missions experimented with various repair materials and techniques, and the STS-118 crew has trained for those procedures.

=== Tuesday August 14 (Flight day 7) ===
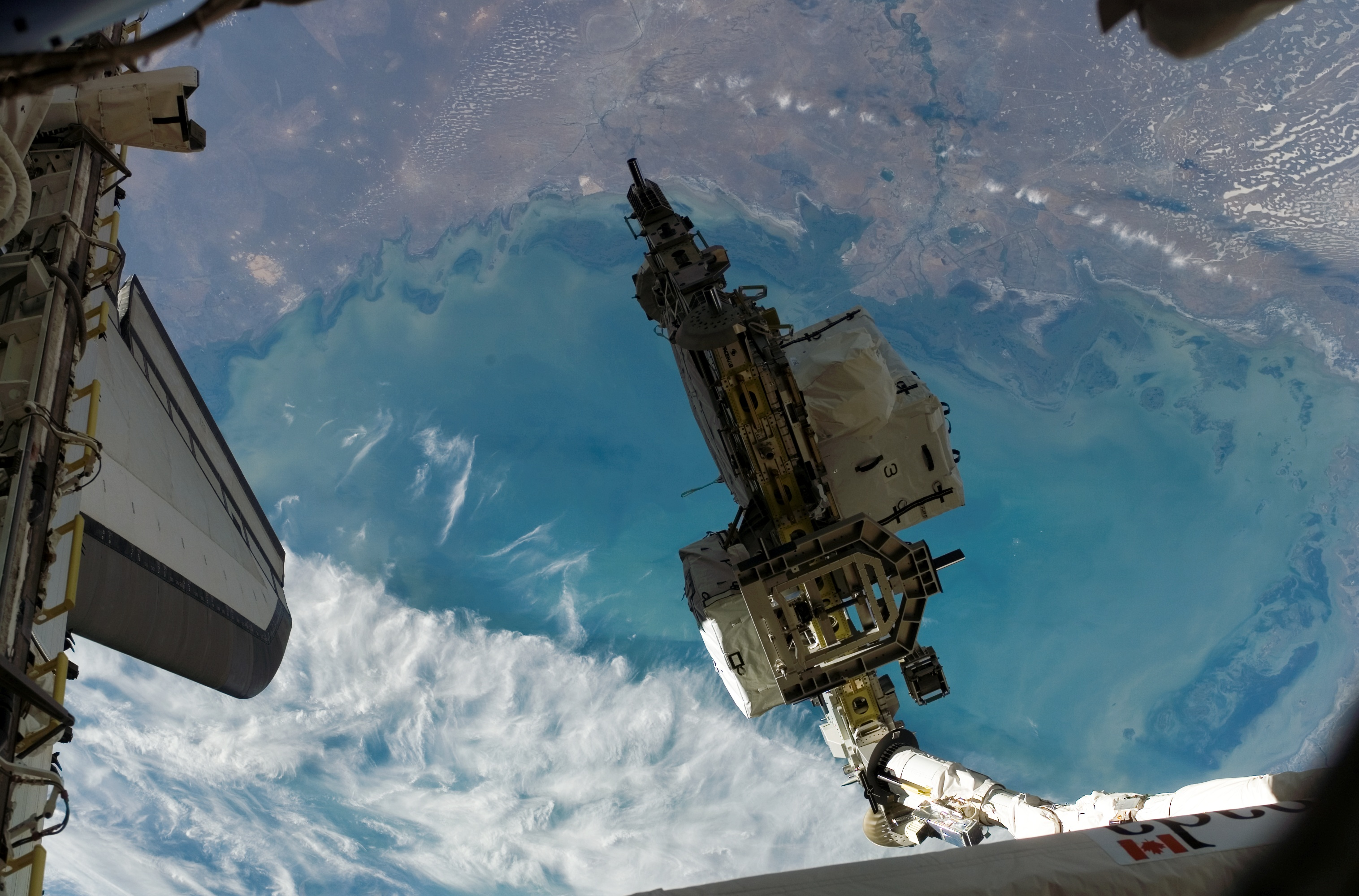
Backdropped by Earth, Endeavour's Canadarm moves the external stowage platform (ESP-3).

The Endeavour crew awoke on Tuesday to the voices of Tracy Caldwell's family singing happy birthday to her. The two crews successfully removed the ESP-3 from Endeavour's payload bay, and installed it onto the P3 truss. They also continued with transfer activities, and several crew members took time out to have two Public Affairs events, one of them answering children's questions from the Discovery Center in Boise, Idaho. During an interview with CBS, Commander Kelly stated that he was not concerned about the tile damage, and would be comfortable with any decision NASA made, "My understanding is this tile damage is not an issue of the safety of the crew... I'm not concerned with our safety." The main reason for fixing it, he noted, would be to assist with processing once the orbiter was back at the Kennedy Space Center.

During the Mission Management Team briefing, Kirk Shireman, Deputy International Space Station Program Manager, reported that the External Stowage Platform installation went well; the new CMG was working well, and handover of attitude control directly from the shuttle to the station was completed without problems. In addition, a new Russian computer was installed on the station, and testing of the system would be performed in late August. He also mentioned several of the experiments that were launched with STS-118, and reported all experiments were proceeding well. Shireman also noted that as of 15:17 UTC, the Zarya module of the station had orbited the Earth 50,000 times.

John Shannon reported that the orbiter systems were in excellent shape, and had no issues. With regard to the remaining area of tile damage on the underside of the orbiter, Shannon reported that initial thermal analysis had been completed. Computational fluid dynamics testing at Ames Research Center had been done, and the preliminary results were "cautiously optimistic". Testing at the arc jet facility would continue Tuesday night. Shannon stated they would go through complete EVA scenario testing at the Neutral Buoyancy Lab, to help develop the EVA procedures if needed.

=== Wednesday August 15 (Flight day 8) ===
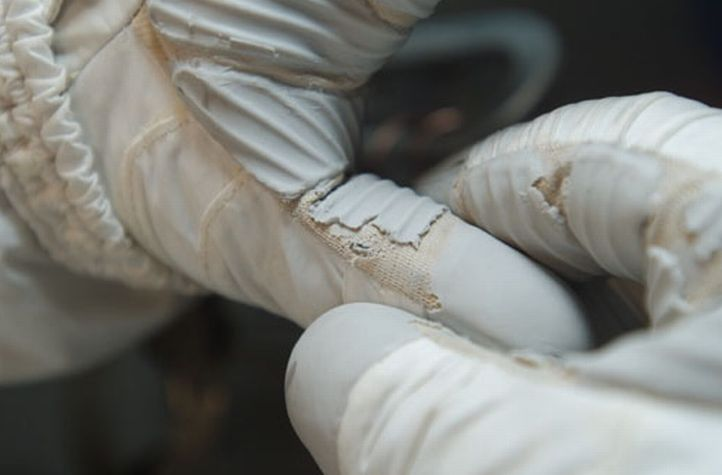
Mastracchio's damaged glove.

Rick Mastracchio and Clayton Anderson began the third EVA of the mission at 14:37 UTC. During the EVA, they successfully relocated a CETA Cart, retrieved the P6 Transponder, relocated the S-band antenna from P6 to P1, and installed a new S-Band Baseband Signal Processor and Transponder on the P1 truss. During a routine glove inspection, Mastracchio noticed a possible tear on the thumb of his left glove. To be safe, NASA managers decided to end the spacewalk at 20:05, and examination and photography of the glove was performed during suit removal. The spacewalk accomplished all but one of the tasks (MISSE retrieval). On the station, the crewmembers continued with transfer activities.

During the Mission Management Team briefing, Joel Montalbano reported that the issue with Mastracchio's suit was never a danger to the suit integrity, and the decision to cut the EVA short was one of precaution. Extended photography was performed, and additional analysis will be completed prior to the fourth EVA. Montalbano reported that the fourth EVA would be no earlier than August 18, 2007.

Lead spacewalk officer Paul Boehm agreed that the EVA went well, the major objectives were completed, and he reiterated that at no time was Mastracchio's suit in any danger of leaking.

EVA Office Manager Steve Doering reported on the details regarding the issue with Mastracchio's glove. The EVA inspection procedure was implemented following STS-116, when a cut was found on Robert Curbeam's glove following an EVA. The EVA suit comprises five layers of material, and the second layer, called vectran, is a high strength material resistant to tearing. Mastracchio's tear was into the vectran layer. Prior to the next EVA, video analysis will be done of the path Mastracchio took during the spacewalk in an attempt to discover where the tear may have occurred. An analysis of Mastracchio's glove during the previous two EVAs will also be performed.

John Shannon reported that no decision had been made regarding the tile damage on the underside of the orbiter, but the fourth EVA was postponed to at least August 18, 2007. The management team would continue to analyze the potential risks of repair to the underside of the orbiter, as well as any other areas of risk. Shannon reported the results of the arc jet testing showed some erosion into the backside of the adjacent tile upon re-entry, but the erosion did not go through the entire layer of the tile. Preliminary results were encouraging, but additional testing would be performed on Wednesday night. Shannon reported that the final decision would most likely be made on Thursday. Shannon said "I am cautiously optimistic that repairs will not be needed".

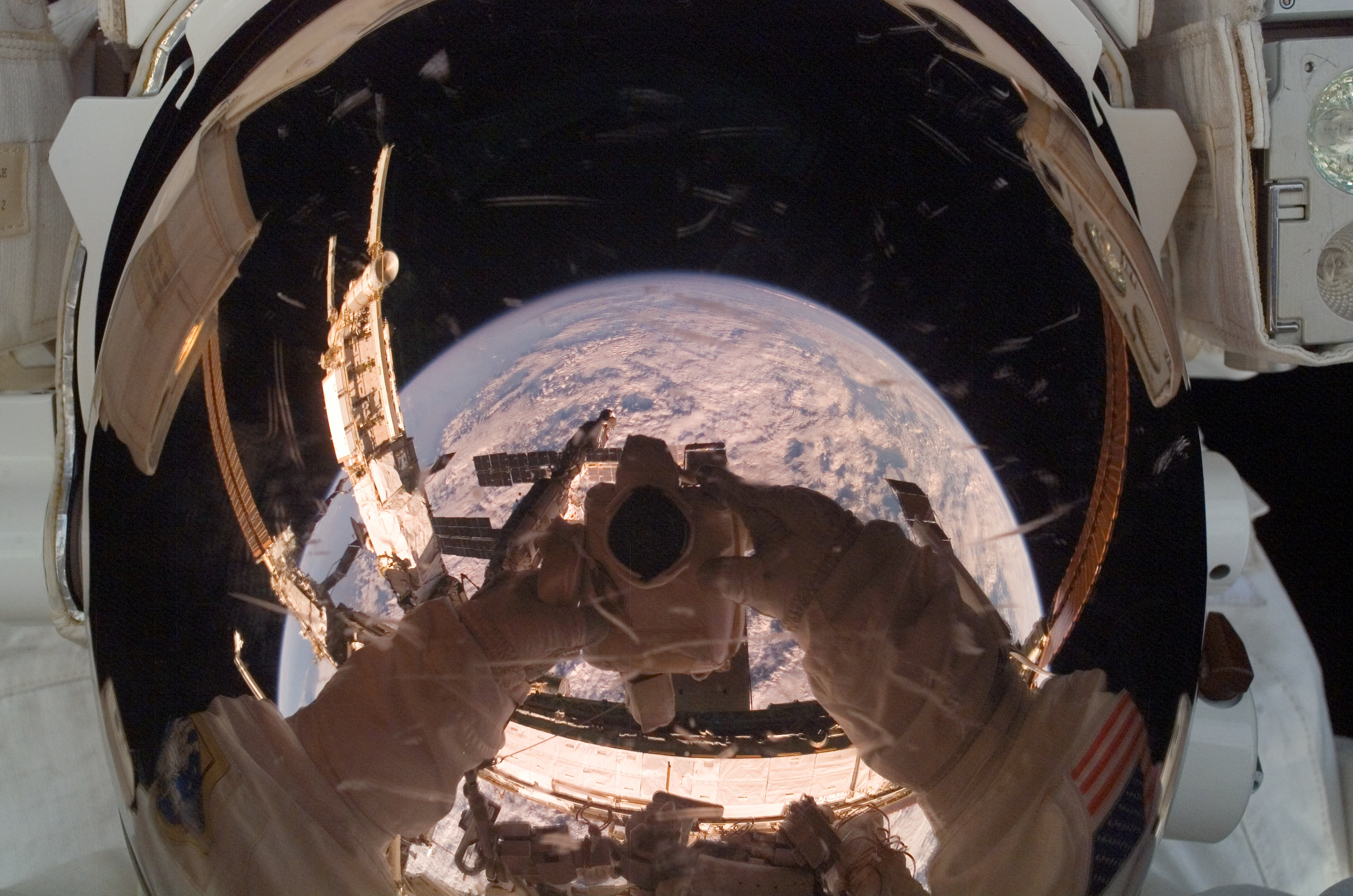
Astronaut Clay Anderson, Expedition 15 flight engineer, uses a digital camera to expose a photo of his helmet visor during the mission's third EVA.

=== Thursday August 16 (Flight day 9) ===
The station and shuttle crews continued transfer activities on flight day 9, as well as EVA preparations, which included TPS repair procedure review, in case NASA decided a repair was necessary.

Mission Specialists Barbara Morgan and Alvin Drew participated in an education event in the morning with students at the Challenger Center for Space Science Education in Alexandria, Virginia. The event was hosted by Dr. June Scobee Rodgers, wife of Challenger's commander, Dick Scobee, and Founding Chairman of the Challenger Center. Morgan and Drew also spoke to reporters from the Associated Press, Reuters and Idaho Public Television.

During the interview with Reuters, Drew stated "We've been talking to the engineers who have been analyzing this far more than we have in space, and they seem to feel that the biggest danger is more to just being able to re-use Endeavour once it gets back on the ground. They seem to be confident, and I trust their confidence that we can get home safely even with the divot that we have in the belly," Morgan added "We have a lot of faith in the program, and we'll do what the engineers decide is the best thing for us to do. We have all confidence we're going to be able to do the right thing."

At 01:00 UTC, August 17, 2007, CAPCOM Shane Kimbrough notified commander Kelly that the Mission Management Team decided that no repair to the damaged tile on the underside of the orbiter would be required.

During the Mission Management Team briefing, John Shannon announced the team's unanimous decision that an EVA to repair the damaged tile was not required, and the tile damage on the underside of the orbiter was not a threat to crew safety. The spacewalk to repair the damage could pose a variety of risks, however, and those risks weighed heavily into the final decision. He noted the arc jet tests actually showed a higher degree of damage than the orbiter would sustain during re-entry, so the tests were helpful in showing the worst "possible" damage, and still did not damage the tile during testing enough to warrant repair.

Shannon did note that the JSC Engineering Independent Group advised NASA managers that repairing the damage on-orbit could assist with mission turn-around time once the orbiter was on the ground. Shannon noted that the risks associated with in-flight repair outweighed the possible delay in processing the orbiter following the mission. He stated that normal turn-around time would not be compromised, as most orbiters have at least 60 tiles replaced after each mission, so the situation would not be any different from past missions.

When pressed during the briefing by a reporter as to the chance of shuttle or crew loss, Shannon reported "I am 100 percent comfortable that the work that has been done, has accurately characterized the damage, and that we will have a very successful re-entry". He stated that over 200 people were involved in the decision, representing over 30 organizations, including NASA Ames Research Center, NASA's Langley Research Center, Jet Propulsion Laboratory, KSC, JSC, and that all the groups combined came to the same decision.

Shannon reported that the glove issue encountered during EVA three had been discussed, and stated that analysis would be continued, in advance of EVA four on Saturday. The crew does have a spare set of gloves, if needed.

Shannon reported on a micro-meteoroid debris strike discovered on the commander's window of the orbiter, which was 1 millimeter in depth. Shannon noted that it was consistent with previous damage sustained on past missions. Analysis would be conducted regarding this issue, using photographs sent down by the crew early Thursday morning.

The final item discussed was Hurricane Dean, which was heading towards the Caribbean Sea, and projected to move into the Gulf of Mexico. Contingency procedures and plans were in place, but Shannon did not anticipate it would affect the mission's timeline at all.

=== Friday August 17 (Flight day 10) ===
The station and shuttle crews had a relatively quiet day on flight day 10, continuing transfer operations, and doing some troubleshooting on a communication system between the shuttle and station. The two crews took some time out to have a joint news conference with US and Canadian news agencies, and took the official combined crew portrait. When asked by reporters on the ground whether the crew agreed with NASA's decision to return without repairing the damage to Endeavour's underside, Commander Kelly replied, "We agree absolutely 100 percent with the decision to not repair the damage."

During the mission status briefing, Lead Flight Director Matt Abbott discussed the ongoing preparations and plans with regard to Hurricane Dean, and reported NASA was watching the storm's track closely. If required, contingency plans are available. While the mission's timeline could be changed if required, no decision was made, and the mission was proceeding as planned.

Deputy ISS Program Manager Kirk Shireman reported the S-Band system relocated during the third EVA was working well, and the SSPTS provided enough oxygen to be able to completely fill all reserves on the station. Shireman commented that transfer operations were approximately 75% complete.

EVA Office Manager Steve Doering reported on the decision to proceed with Saturday's EVA. The team analyzed the video downlinked from the third EVA, and the review showed no evidence of any specific event that would indicate a sharp edge, or excessive wear. A review of the manufacturing of the gloves was done, and no concerns were identified. The paths taken by astronauts during spacewalks were reviewed, identifying common paths between the third EVA, and Saturday's planned EVA, and the crew was notified of the common locations, to identify areas where additional glove inspections would be performed on Saturday. Overall, the final EVA would be less "hand-intensive" than the previous spacewalks, and the conclusion following the analysis was that Saturday's EVA would go ahead as planned.

=== Saturday August 18 (Flight day 11) ===
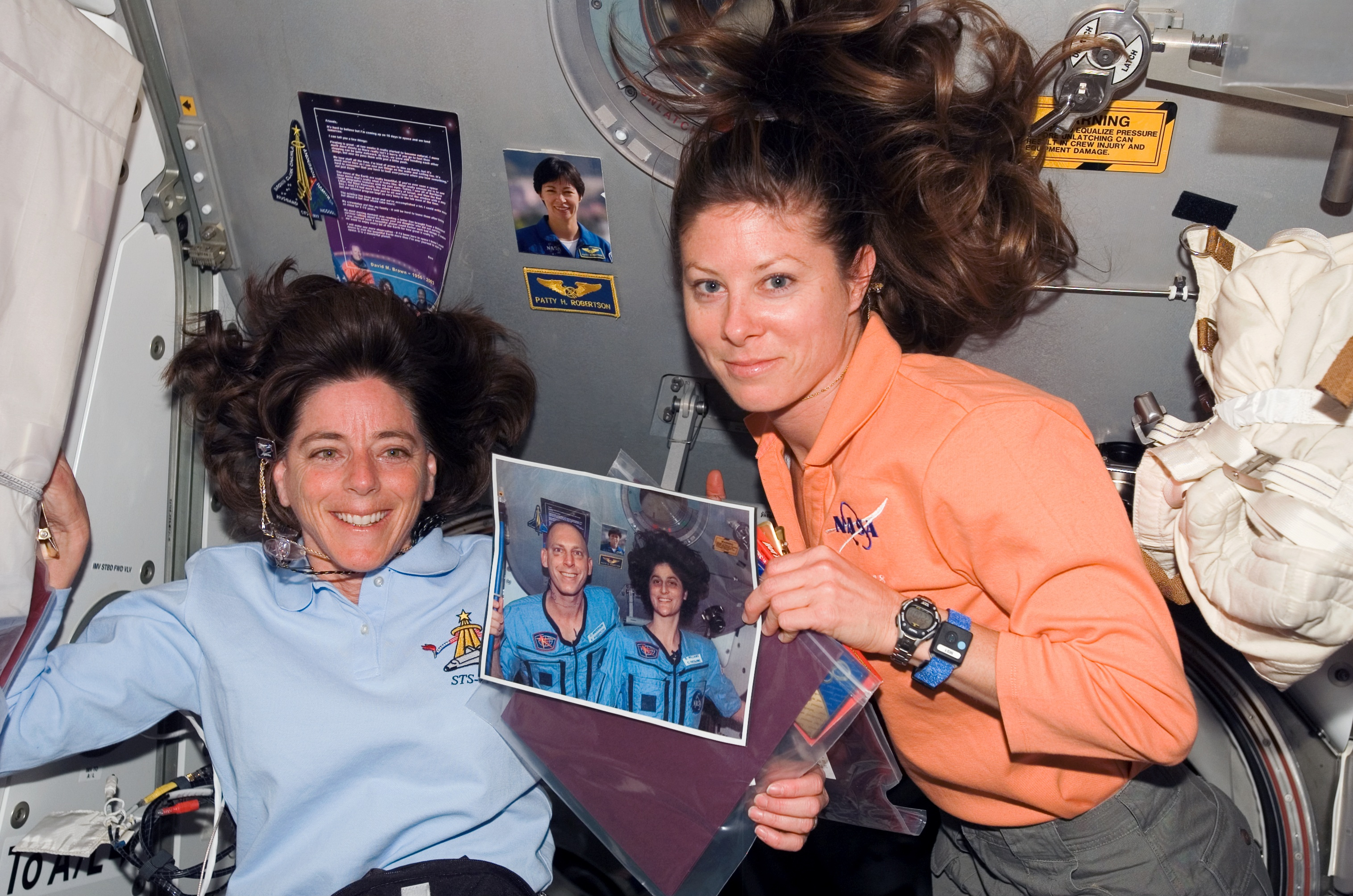
Morgan and Caldwell pose for a tribute photo, holding a picture of Expedition 15 crewmembers, and behind them are tributes to their classmate Patty Hilliard Robertson and the STS-107 crew.

NASA Managers decided overnight to shorten the fourth EVA by two hours as a precaution due to Hurricane Dean's continued path into the Gulf of Mexico. The EVA duration was five hours and 2 minutes, with a total EVA time of 23 hours and 15 minutes for the mission. The EVA accomplished three primary objectives, and one get-ahead task. Two tasks were deferred: plans to tie down debris shields on the Destiny lab, and relocation of a tool box. During the spacewalk, Williams and Anderson got a good look at Hurricane Dean, and were both awed at the sight. "Holy smoke" was Anderon's initial comment. "Man, that's impressive", Williams replied. Anderson added "They're only impressive when they're not coming towards you." Transfer activities were completed ahead of schedule, and both crews worked hard to get everything transferred back to Endeavour after the spacewalk.

Dave Williams set two records during his third EVA; He is the Canadian with the most spacewalks (3); and he passed Canadian Astronaut Chris Hadfield in total EVA time. Williams ended Saturday's EVA with a total of 17 hours, 47 minutes of extravehicular time.

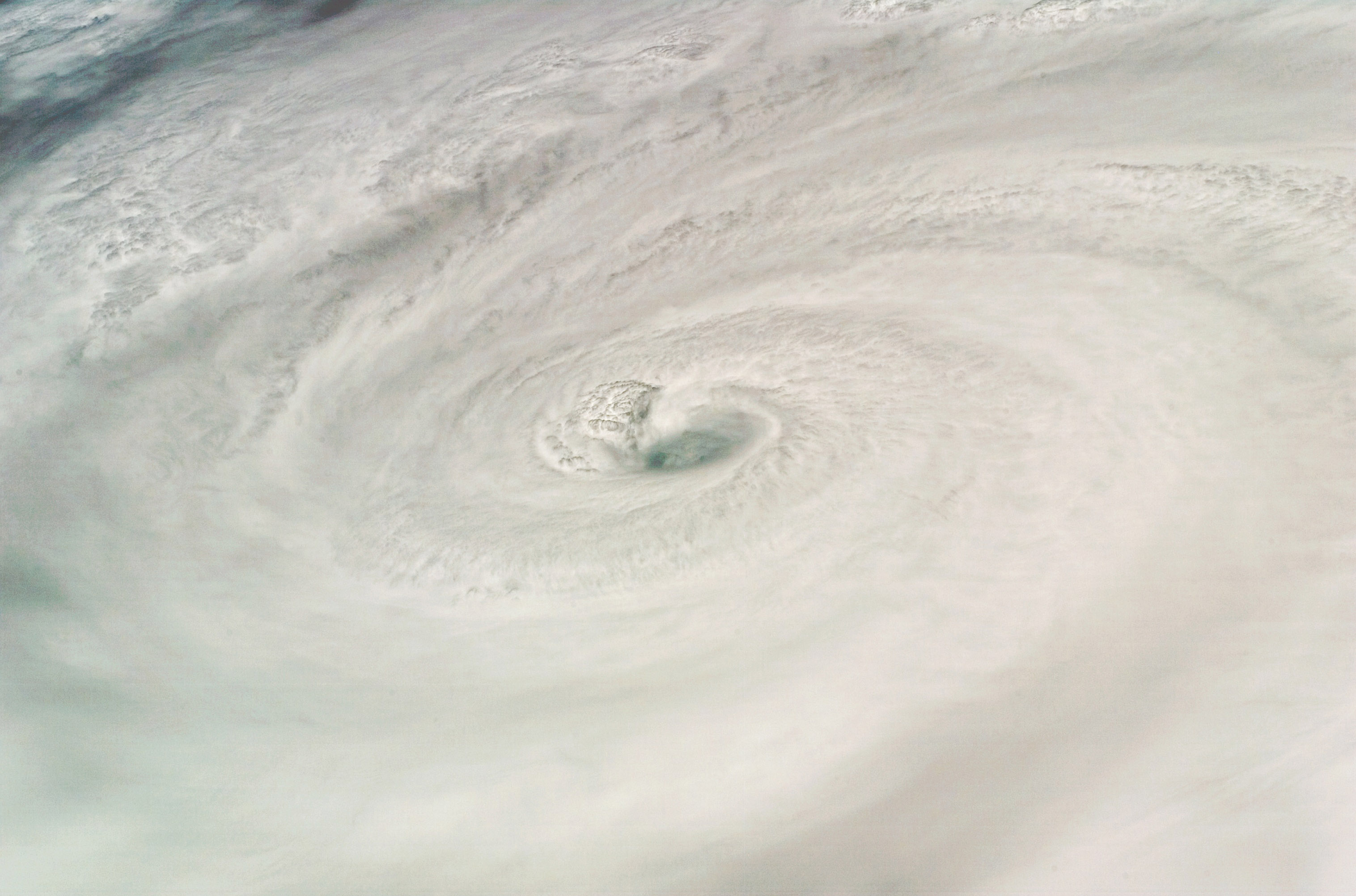
View of Hurricane Dean taken from the International Space Station during the fourth STS-118 EVA.

During the mission status briefing, Launch Integration Manager LeRoy Cain reported that the Mission Management Team decided to take extra precautions in preparation for the storm, and STS-118 would be cut short a day. In the event of a hurricane evacuation in Houston, an emergency command center would need to be set up. While it was a contingency set in place for years, NASA would prefer to avoid that situation. To that end, Cain reported the EVA was shortened, and the hatch closure would be done Saturday evening, rather than Sunday as planned. Undocking would be at 11:57 UTC Sunday, with the first KSC Landing opportunity on August 21, 2007.

At 19:46, a short farewell ceremony was performed, followed by hatch closure at 20:10 UTC. Tuesday's tentative KSC landing time would be 12:32 pm EST. (16:30 UTC)

=== Sunday August 19 (Flight day 12) ===
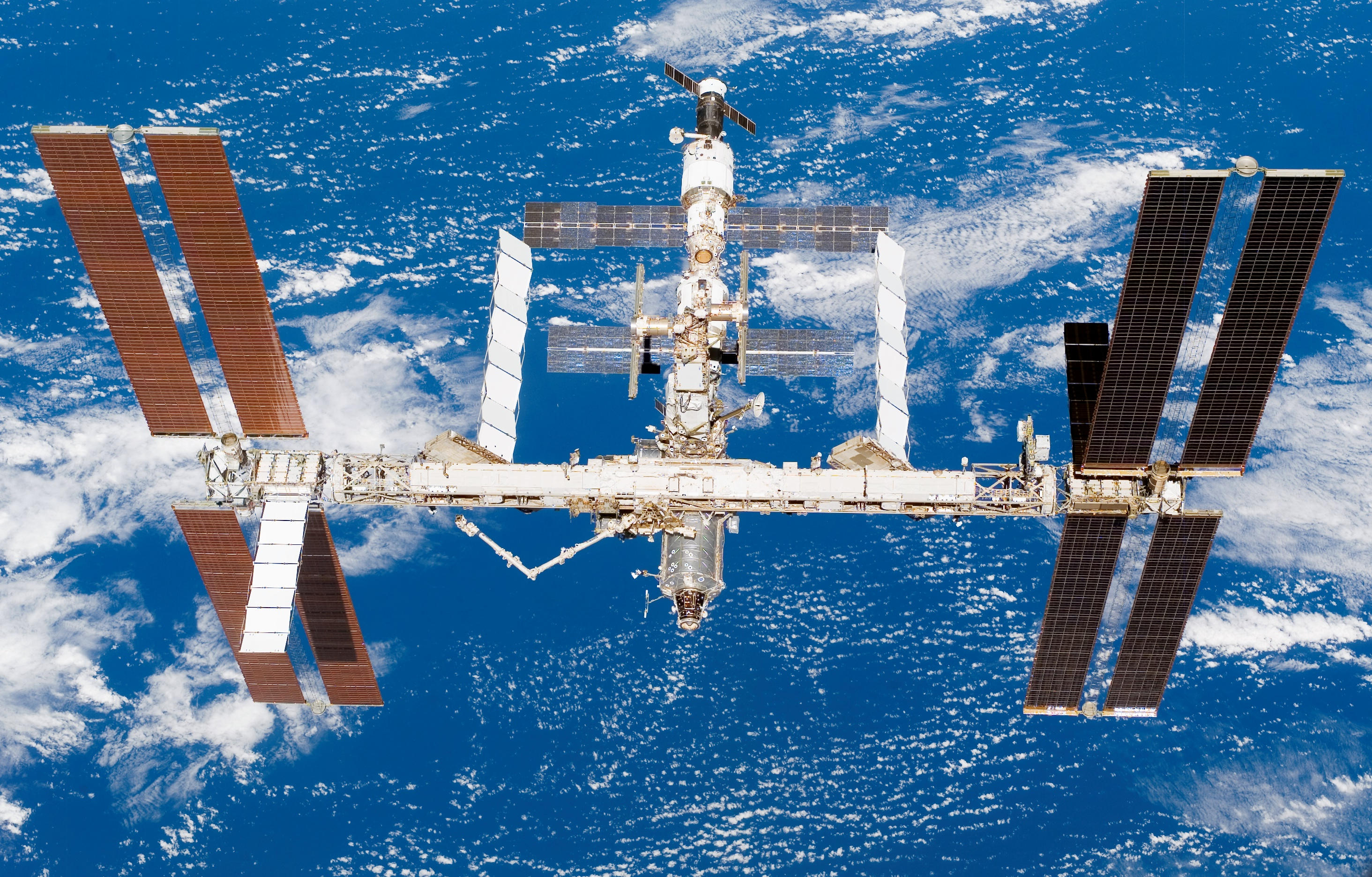
The International Space Station moves away from Space Shuttle Endeavour during STS-118

Endeavour successfully undocked from the International Space Station at 11:56 UTC. Saturday, NASA managers decided the station fly-around that is normally performed following each mission would not be conducted in order to give the Shuttle crew more free time during flight day 12. After several long work days, the Mission Control team felt the crew needed some downtime before the landing process began.

After undocking, two 4-second firings of the Reaction Control System were performed, in order to distance Endeavour from the station and move to a position above it. There, the crew deployed the robotic arm, beginning Late Inspection of the reinforced carbon-carbon tiles on the nose cap and wing leading edges.

At the mission status briefing, Matt Abbott reported the undocking was "flawless", and the late inspection was completed successfully. Monday would be a standard pre-landing day, with checkout of the various systems on Endeavour, as well as an educational media event. Entry Flight Director Steve Stich and the entry team will take over mission duties tonight, in preparation for Tuesday's landing.

John Shannon reported the mission management team meeting went well. The landing plan was reviewed, and all teams reported "go" for landing on Tuesday. The latest track for Hurricane Dean was favorable for the Houston area; the storm seemed to be swinging farther south than originally expected. NASA managers were optimistic that contingency plans would not be needed. Final decisions regarding alternate plans would not be made until Monday, but Shannon noted that White Sands Space Harbor landing facility would be removed as an alternate site. Edwards Air Force Base, and Kennedy Shuttle Landing Facility would be the two sites evaluated on Monday.

=== Monday August 20 (Flight day 13) ===
On Monday, with the shuttle approximately 68 miles (109 km) behind the International Space Station, the crew of Endeavour performed a variety of check-out tests in preparation for entry, configured the Spacehab module for entry, and did some last minute stowage. Kelly and Hobaugh worked with the shuttle landing simulator on board, practicing the anticipated landing tracks. Kelly, Williams and Morgan took some time out to talk to students at the Canadian school, La Ronge, in Saskatchewan.

During the mission status briefing, Entry Flight Director Steve Stich reported the track of Hurricane Dean would not require the activation of contingency plans, and the forecast looked favorable for a Tuesday landing at Kennedy Shuttle Landing Facility. There were also two opportunities for a Florida landing, with the first opportunity beginning with a deorbit burn at 15:25 UTC, and landing at 16:32 UTC. The second opportunity would call for a deorbit burn at 17:00 UTC, with landing at 18:16 UTC. Weather was not expected to interfere with landing, with a forecast of high clouds, but no inclement weather. If the second landing opportunity was taken, the shuttle would fly directly over Hurricane Dean, although it would be well above any effects of the storm. NASA did plan to call up Edwards Air Force Base as the backup site, which had two opportunities on Tuesday, but the plan was to attempt a KSC landing, and if both opportunities were waved off, NASA would decide whether to wait a day, and try for a Wednesday landing at KSC. If Wednesday opportunities at Florida were waved off due to weather, a landing at Edwards Air Force Base would be attempted.

=== Tuesday August 21 (Flight day 14, Landing) ===
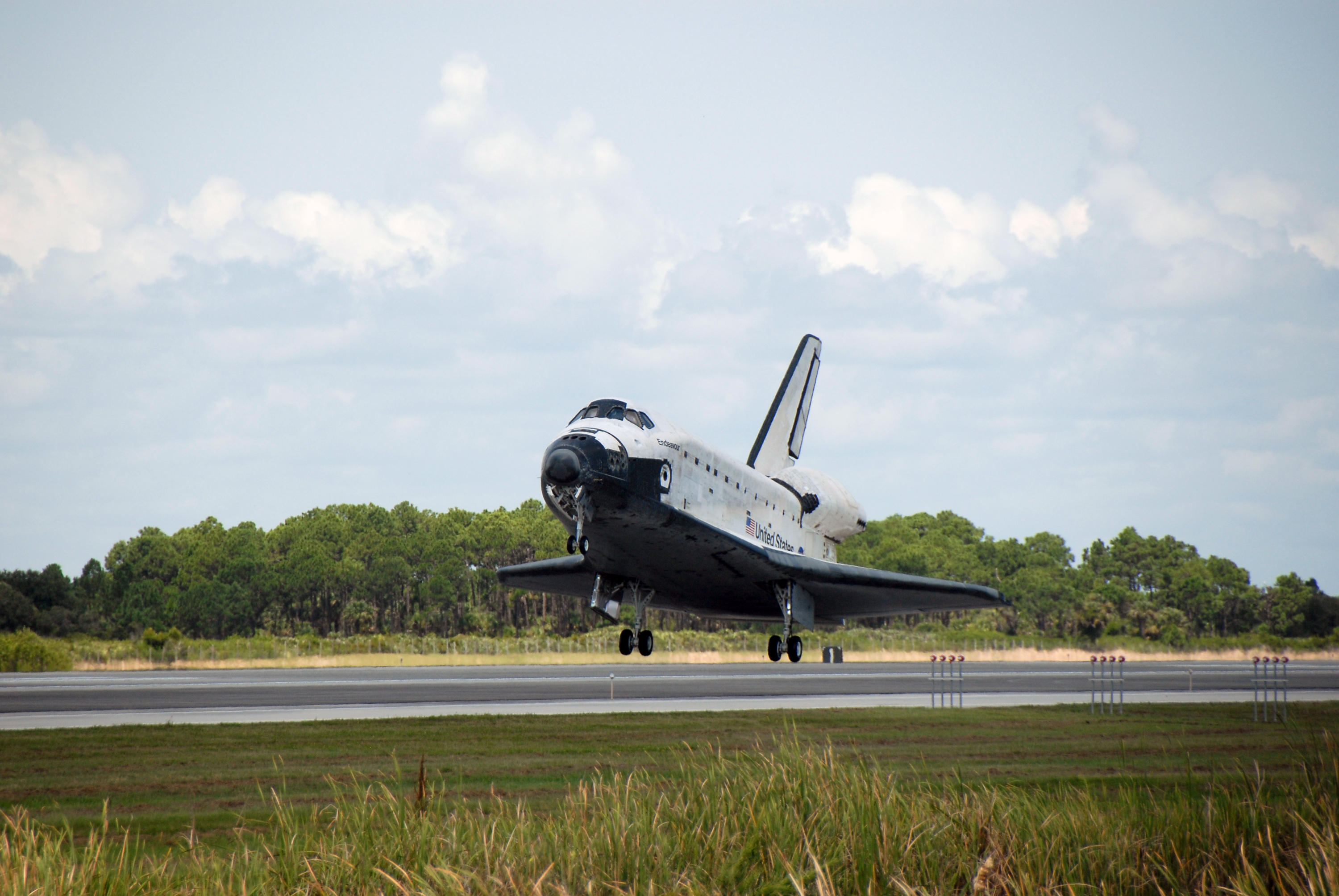
Endeavour landing at Kennedy Space Center.

The crew of Endeavour went right to work after waking up on Tuesday, completing the close-out of the Spacehab module, and getting into the deorbit preparations timeline. They closed payload bay doors, transitioned the vehicle computers to landing software mode and donned their reentry suits. At 14:30 UTC, the crew was given the "go" to begin fluid loading. This was done to assist with the crew's ability to adjust to gravity, and to prevent hypotension after landing. At 12:30 UTC, the Space Flight Meteorology Group reported to Entry Team Flight Director Steve Stich that the weather forecast was a "go". The weather at Kennedy Space Center showed only scattered showers moving away from the landing facility, and cross winds were not expected to be a problem. At 15:08 UTC, the crew was given a "go" for the deorbit burn, and the auxiliary power units were started at 15:20 UTC. The 4-minute engine burn was successfully completed at 15:28 UTC, slowing Endeavour by approximately 252 mph (406 km/h) and adjusting the orbiter's trajectory correctly for landing.

Radar acquisition of Endeavour through MILA happened at 16:19 UTC. At 16:20 UTC, the shuttle had passed the area of peak heating, with no issues reported on board. Main landing gear touchdown occurred at 16:32:16 UTC with nose gear touchdown at 16:32:29 UTC. The orbiter came to a complete stop at 16:33:20 UTC. Upon wheel stop, CAPCOM Christopher Ferguson told the crew, "Congratulations, you've given a new meaning to the term 'higher education.'"

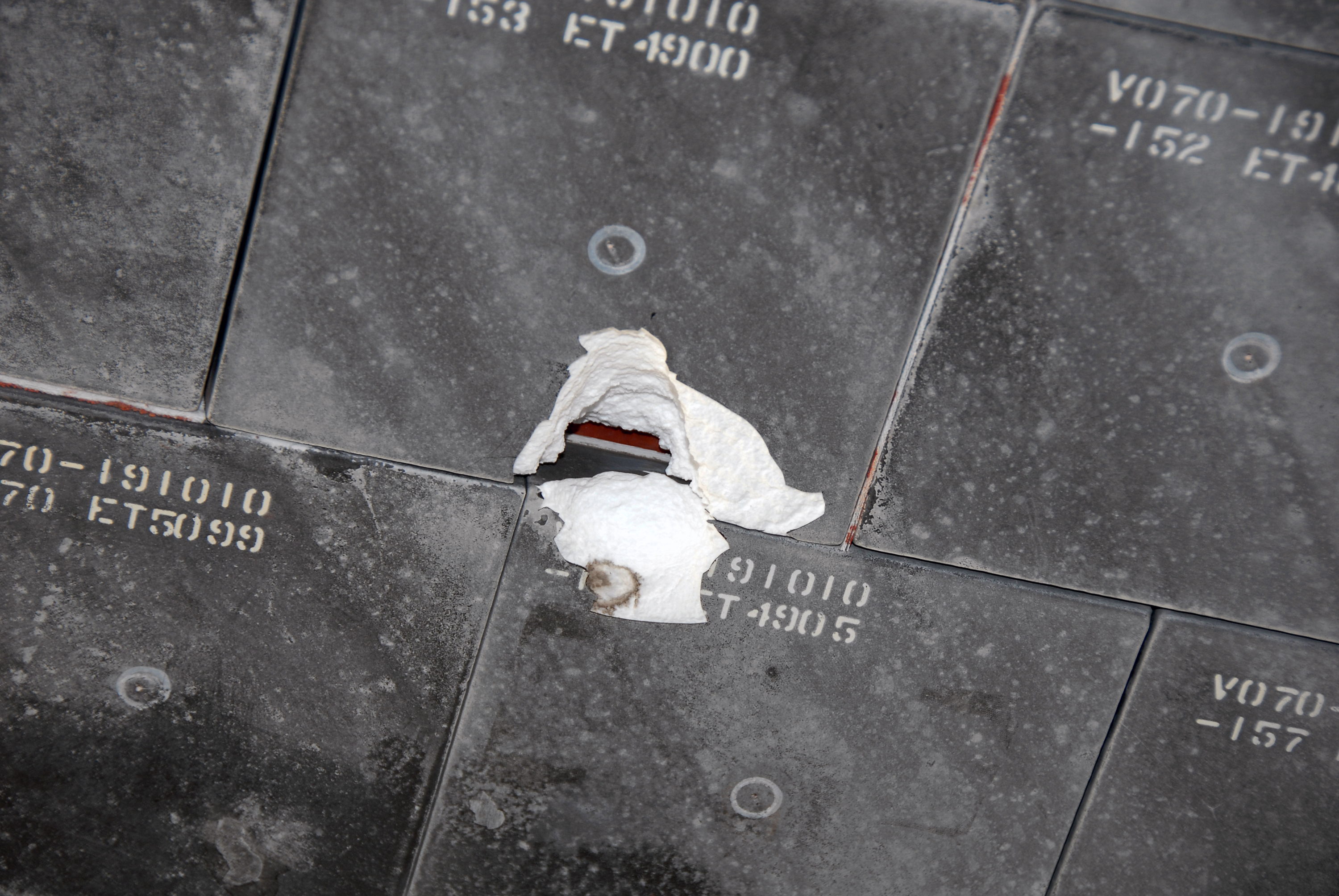
Damaged tile in the belly of Endeavour during post-landing inspection.

Initial post-landing inspection of the orbiter showed very little additional damage to the thermal tiles affected by the foam strike during launch. Barbara Morgan did not exit the crew transport vehicle with the rest of the crew; she remained on board the vehicle to receive additional medical tests, and would return to the Astronaut Crew Quarters in that vehicle. The remaining six crew members briefly examined the orbiter, doing the traditional post-flight "walkaround", posed for photos, and then returned to the crew quarters in the Astrovan.

During the post-landing briefing, NASA Administrator Michael D. Griffin reported that the International Space Station was approximately 60% completed following STS-118. Griffin also stressed the importance of space exploration, and added that the damaged tile on the underside of the orbiter did very well during re-entry.

Associate Administrator for Spaceflight Operations William H. Gerstenmaier reported the damage was actually less than what the arc jet testing produced, a situation that NASA anticipated, and managers had earlier stressed that arc jets show "worst possible" damage. Launch Director Mike Leinbach stressed how pleased he was with the mission, and with the condition of the vehicle following re-entry. He stated it was "one of the cleanest vehicles the managers have seen since the Return to Flight policies were implemented, if not the cleanest."

At the end of the briefing, Griffin commented to the media who focused on Barbara Morgan being the first "teacher in space", that Morgan was not technically a "teacher in space", nor was she an "educator astronaut". He stated she was accepted as a mission specialist, before the new class of mission specialist educators were selected in 2004, and NASA considers her to be a mission specialist, who was once a teacher. NASA does refer to Morgan as a mission specialist educator in a number of interviews, so the terms seem to be interchangeable to most, if not to Griffin.

During the post-landing crew press conference, Kelly was asked "Did the tile damage enter your mind at all during re-entry, and what did you think about it once you got a look during the walkaround?" Kelly's reply was, "I thought about it, but only because I knew I'd be asked about it. I didn't worry about it at all. I was underwhelmed by it."

Summarizing her thoughts on her time in space, Morgan commented,

"You know, there's a great sense of pride to be able to be involved in a human endeavor that takes us all a little bit farther, when you look down and see our Earth... and you realize what we are trying to do as a human race, it's pretty profound."

== Extra-vehicular activity ==
| EVA | Spacewalkers | Start (UTC) | End | Duration | Mission |
|---|---|---|---|---|---|
| EVA 1 | Rick Mastracchio; Dave Williams | 11 August 2007 16:28 UTC | 11 August 2007 22:45 UTC | 6 hours, 17 minutes | S5 Installation, P6 Radiator retraction and cinch. |
| EVA 2 | Rick Mastracchio; Dave Williams | 13 August 2007 15:32 UTC | 13 August 2007 22:00 UTC | 6 hours, 28 minutes | Failed CMG removal; new CMG installation. |
| EVA 3 | Rick Mastracchio; Clayton Anderson | 15 August 2007 14:37 UTC | 15 August 2007 20:05 UTC | 5 hours, 28 minutes | S-Band Antenna Structural Assembly (SASA) relocation from P6 to P1, installation of S-Band Baseband Signal Processor and Transponder to P1, CETA Cart relocation and P6 Transponder retrieval. |
| EVA 4 | Dave Williams; Clayton Anderson | 18 August 2007 14:17 UTC | 18 August 2007 19:19 UTC | 5 hours, 2 minutes | OBSS Boom Stand Installation; Retrieval of the MISSE-3 and 4 experiments; EWIS Antenna Installation; Secured Z1 SASA gimbal locks in preparation for down mass on 10A. |

== Wake-up calls ==
NASA began a tradition of playing music to astronauts during the Gemini program, which was first used to wake up a flight crew during Apollo 15. Each track is specially chosen, often by their family, and usually has special meaning to an individual member of the crew, or is applicable to their daily activities.

| Flight Day | Song | Artist | Played for | Links |
|---|---|---|---|---|
| Day 2 | "Where My Heart Will Take Me" | Russell Watson | Rick Mastracchio | wav mp3 |
| Day 3 | "Mr. Blue Sky" | Electric Light Orchestra | Scott Kelly | wav mp3 |
| Day 4 | "Gravity" | John Mayer | Charles O. Hobaugh | wav mp3 |
| Day 5 | "Up!" | Shania Twain | Dave Williams | wav mp3 |
| Day 6 | "Outa-Space" | Billy Preston | Alvin Drew | wav mp3 |
| Day 7 | "Happy Birthday to You" | Tracy's nieces and nephews | Tracy Caldwell, for her 38th birthday | wav mp3 |
| Day 8 | "Good Morning World" | Adam, Barbara's son | Barbara Morgan | wav mp3 |
| Day 9 | "Times Like These" | Foo Fighters | Rick Mastracchio | wav mp3 |
| Day 10 | "Black Horse and the Cherry Tree" | KT Tunstall | Tracy Caldwell | wav mp3 |
| Day 11 | "Learn to Fly" | Foo Fighters | Al Drew | wav mp3 |
| Day 12 | "Teacher, Teacher" | 38 Special | Barbara Morgan | wavmp3 |
| Day 13 | "Flying" | Long John Baldry Trio | Dave Williams | wavmp3 |
| Day 14 | "Homeward Bound" | Simon and Garfunkel | entire crew | wavmp3 |

== Contingency mission ==
STS-322 was the designation given to the Contingency Shuttle Crew Support mission that would have been launched in the event Endeavour had become disabled during STS-118. It would have been a modified version of the STS-120 mission, which would have involved the launch date being brought forward. If it had been needed, it would have been launched no earlier than September 22, 2007. The crew for this mission would have been a four-person subset of the full STS-120 crew.

== Media ==
Launch of the Space Shuttle Endeavour from Kennedy Space Center in the mission STS-118

== See also ==
- 2007 in spaceflight
- List of human spaceflights
- List of International Space Station spacewalks
- List of Space Shuttle missions
- Lists of spacewalks and moonwalks
