= STS-104 =

2001 American crewed spaceflight to the ISS

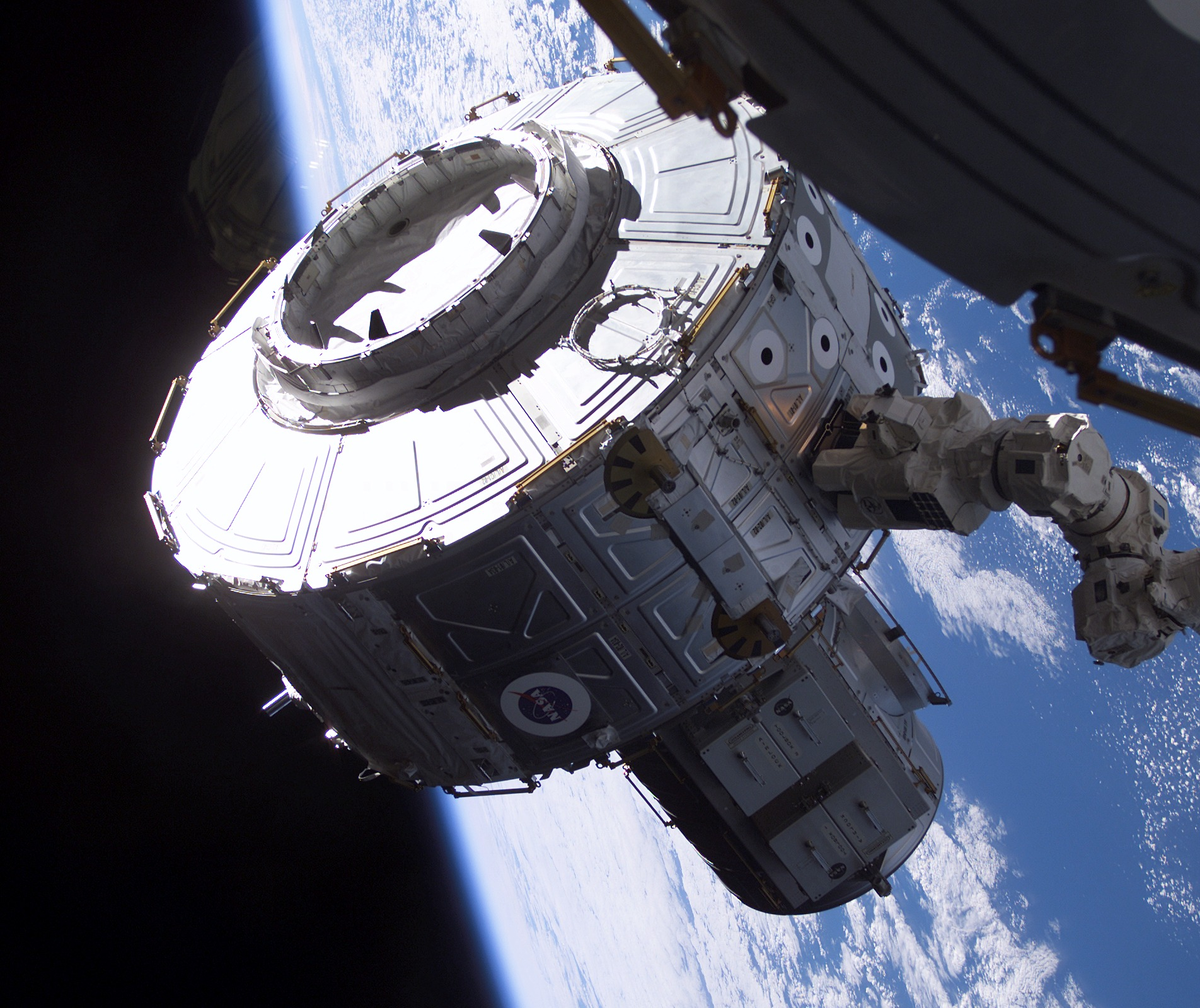
- Quest being grappled by Canadarm2, prior to its installation on the ISS
- Names: Space Transportation System-104
- Mission type: ISS assembly
- Operator: NASA
- COSPAR ID: 2001-028A
- SATCAT no.: 26862
- Mission duration: 12 days, 18 hours, 36 minutes, 39 seconds
- Distance travelled: 8,500,000 kilometres (5,300,000 mi)
- Orbits completed: 200

Spacecraft properties
- Spacecraft: Space Shuttle Atlantis
- Launch mass: 117,129 kilograms (258,225 lb)
- Landing mass: 94,009 kilograms (207,254 lb)
- Payload mass: 8,241 kilograms (18,168 lb)

Crew
- Crew size: 5
- Members: Steven W. Lindsey; Charles O. Hobaugh; Michael L. Gernhardt; Janet L. Kavandi; James F. Reilly
- EVAs: 3
- EVA duration: 16 hours, 30 minutes

Start of mission
- Launch date: 12 July 2001, 09:04 UTC
- Launch site: Kennedy, LC-39B

End of mission
- Landing date: 25 July 2001, 03:38 UTC
- Landing site: Kennedy, SLF Runway 15

Orbital parameters
- Reference system: Geocentric
- Regime: Low Earth
- Perigee altitude: 372 kilometres (231 mi)
- Apogee altitude: 390 kilometres (240 mi)
- Inclination: 51.6 degrees
- Period: 92.2 minutes

Docking with ISS
- Docking port: PMA-2 (Destiny forward)
- Docking date: 14 July 2001 03:08 UTC
- Undocking date: 22 July 2001 04:54 UTC
- Time docked: 8 days, 1 hour, 46 minutes
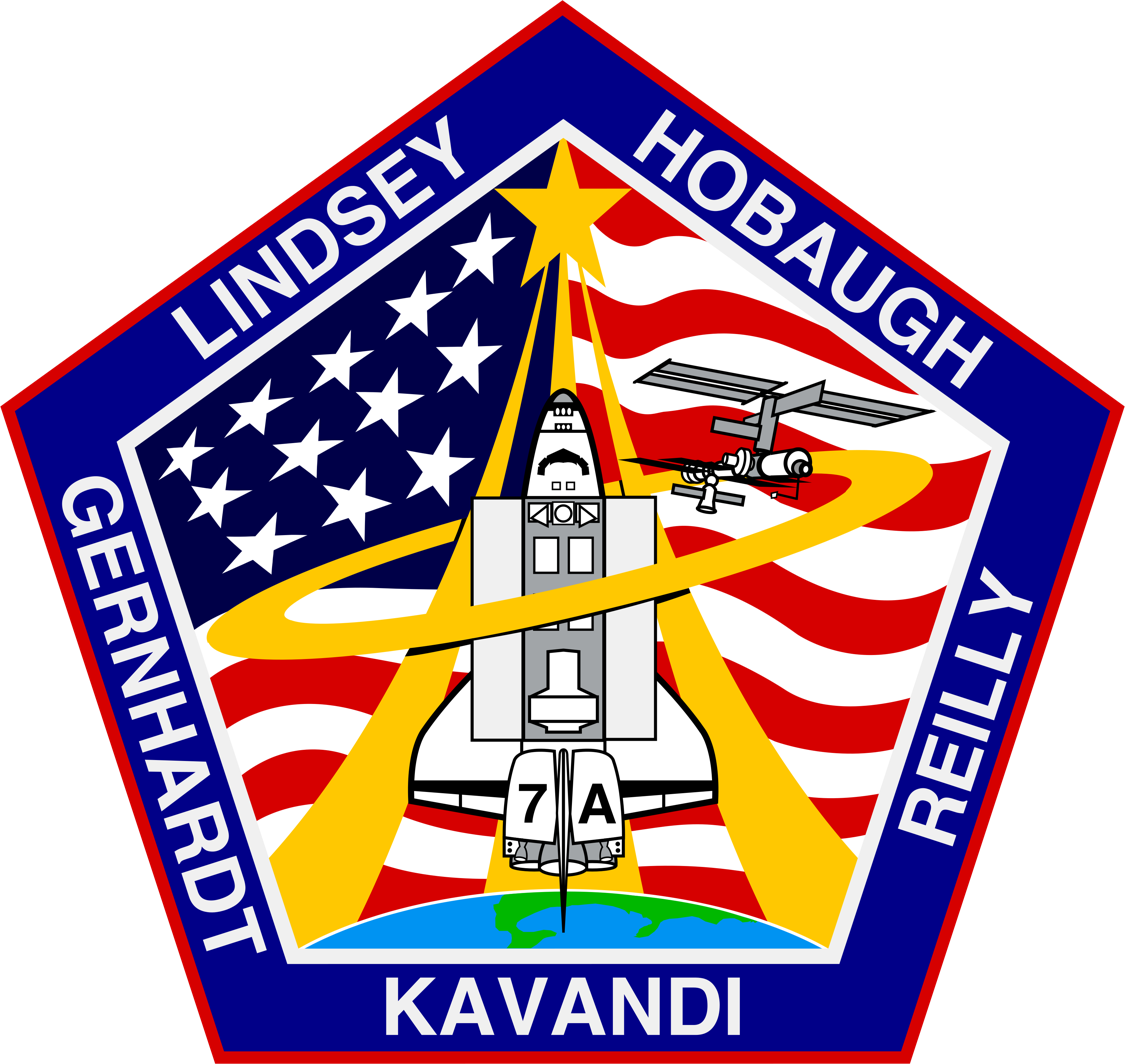
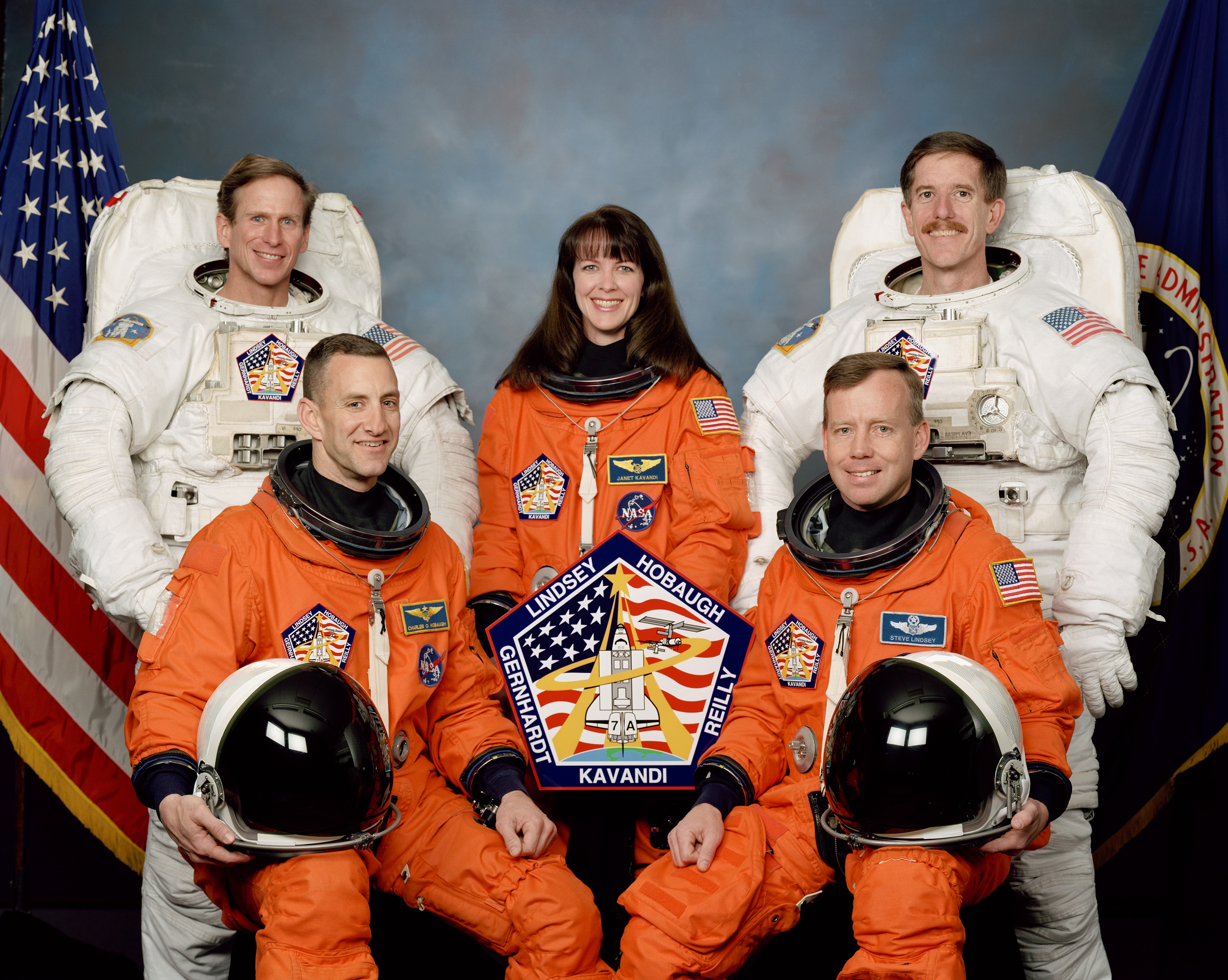
- Left to right: Seated - Charles O. Hobaugh, Steven W. Lindsey; Standing - Michael L. Gernhardt, Janet L. Kavandi, James F. Reilly Space Shuttle program

STS-104 was a Space Shuttle mission to the International Space Station (ISS) flown by Space Shuttle Atlantis. Its primary objectives were to install the Quest Joint Airlock and help perform maintenance on the International Space Station. It launched on 12 July 2001 at 09:04 UTC, and returned to Earth without incident after successful docking, equipment installation, and three spacewalks.

== Crew ==
Position	Astronaut
Commander	Steven W. Lindsey; Third spaceflight
Pilot	Charles O. Hobaugh; First spaceflight
Mission Specialist 1	Michael L. Gernhardt; Fourth and last spaceflight
Mission Specialist 2 Flight Engineer	Janet L. Kavandi; Third and last spaceflight
Mission Specialist 3	James F. Reilly; Second spaceflight

=== Crew seat assignments ===
Seat	Launch	Landing	Seats 1–4 are on the flight deck. Seats 5–7 are on the mid-deck.
1	Lindsey		Seats 1–4 are on the flight deck. Seats 5–7 are on the mid-deck.
2	Hobaugh		Seats 1–4 are on the flight deck. Seats 5–7 are on the mid-deck.
3	Gernhardt	Reilly	Seats 1–4 are on the flight deck. Seats 5–7 are on the mid-deck.
4	Kavandi		Seats 1–4 are on the flight deck. Seats 5–7 are on the mid-deck.
5	Reilly	Gernhardt	Seats 1–4 are on the flight deck. Seats 5–7 are on the mid-deck.
6	Unused		Seats 1–4 are on the flight deck. Seats 5–7 are on the mid-deck.
7	Unused		Seats 1–4 are on the flight deck. Seats 5–7 are on the mid-deck.

== Mission highlights ==
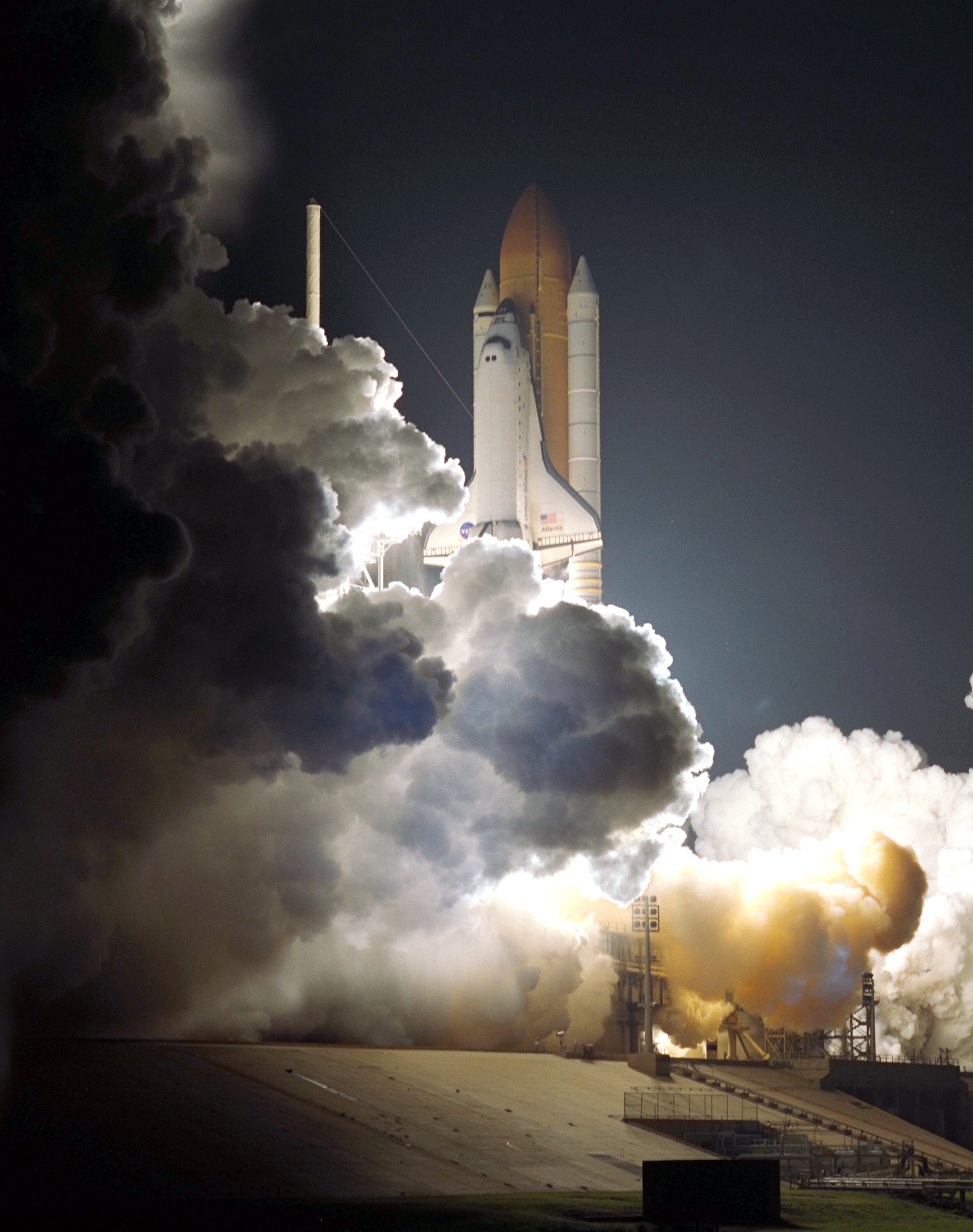
Launch of Space Shuttle Atlantis on STS-104 mission.

The primary purpose of the flight was to deliver and install the Quest airlock. The Joint Airlock is a pressurized flight element consisting of two cylindrical chambers attached end-to-end by a connecting bulkhead and hatch. Once installed and activated, the ISS airlock became the primary path for International Space Station space walk entry and departure for U.S. spacesuits, which are known as Extravehicular Mobility Units, or EMUs. In addition, the Joint Airlock is designed to support the Russian Orlan spacesuit for EVA activity.

The Joint Airlock is 20 ft (6.1 m) long, 13 ft (4.0 m) in diameter and weighs 6.5 short tons (5.9 metric tons). It is made from steel and aluminum, and manufactured at the Marshall Space Flight Center (MSFC) by the Space Station main contractor Boeing. The ISS-airlock has two main components: a crew airlock and an equipment airlock for storing EVA gear and EVA preflight preps. STS-104 also carried 2 spacelab pallets with four High Pressure Gas Assembly containers total that were attached to the exterior of the airlock.

Mission Specialists Michael Gernhardt and James Reilly conducted three space walks while Space Shuttle Atlantis was docked to the International Space Station. They spent a total of 16 hours and 30 minutes outside. During the first space walk, Gernhardt and Reilly assisted in the installation of the airlock. During the second and third excursions, they focused on the external outfitting of the Quest airlock with four High Pressure Gas Tanks, handrails and other vital equipment. The third spacewalk was conducted from Quest itself.

STS-104 was the final Space Shuttle mission to have a five-member crew. All succeeding missions would have six or seven (except the final mission STS-135, which had 4).

=== First flight of Block II SSME ===
STS-104 was the first shuttle mission to fly with a "Block II" SSME. Post-launch analysis indicated an anomaly occurred when the engine was shut down. The cause was determined and the mitigation approach was demonstrated on the STS-108 flight in November 2001.

== Space walks ==
- Gernhardt and Reilly – EVA 1
- EVA 1 Start: 15 July 2001 – 03:10 UTC
- EVA 1 End: 15 July 2001 – 09:09 UTC
- Duration: 5 hours, 59 minutes
- Gernhardt and Reilly – EVA 2
- EVA 2 Start: 18 July 2001 – 03:04 UTC
- EVA 2 End: 18 July 2001 – 09:33 UTC
- Duration: 6 hours, 29 minutes
- Gernhardt and Reilly – EVA 3
- EVA 3 Start: 21 July 2001 – 04:35 UTC
- EVA 3 End: 21 July 2001 – 08:37 UTC
- Duration: 4 hours, 02 minutes

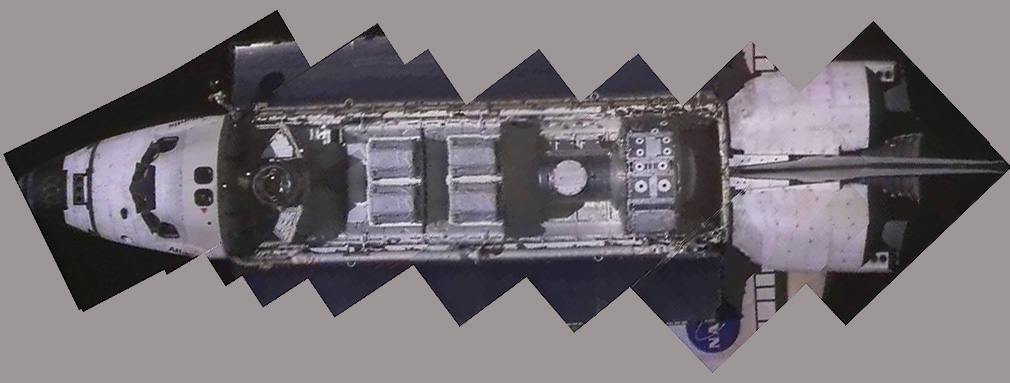
The payload bay of STS-104 imaged by TV camera during its approach to the ISS, no still photography was made of this event

== Wake-up calls ==
NASA began a tradition of playing music to astronauts during the Gemini program, which was first used to wake up a flight crew during Apollo 15. Each track is specially chosen, often by their families, and usually has a special meaning to an individual member of the crew, or is applicable to their daily activities.

Flight Day	Song	Artist/Composer
Day 2	"Wallace Courts Murron"	Braveheart Soundtrack
Day 3	"God of Wonders"	Caedmons Call
Day 4	"Space Cowboy"	'N Sync, from the soundtrack to Space Cowboys
Day 5	"No Woman, No Cry"	Bob Marley
Day 6	"Nobody Does It Better"	Carly Simon, from the soundtrack to The Spy Who Loved Me
Day 7	"Happy Birthday, Darling"	Conway Twitty
Day 8	"All I Wanna Do"	Sheryl Crow
Day 9	"A Time to Dance"	Space Center Intermediate School Symphonic Band
Day 10	"I Could Write a Book"	Harry Connick Jr., from the soundtrack to When Harry Met Sally...
Day 11	"Who Let the Dogs Out?"	The Baha Boys
Day 12	"Orinoco Flow"	Enya
Day 13	"Honey, I'm Home"	Shania Twain
Day 14	"Hold Back the Rain"	Duran Duran

== See also ==
- List of human spaceflights
- List of International Space Station spacewalks
- List of Space Shuttle missions
- List of spacewalks and moonwalks 1965–1999
- Outline of space science
