= Charles O. Hobaugh =

American astronaut and US Marine Corps officer (born 1961)

Charles Hobaugh
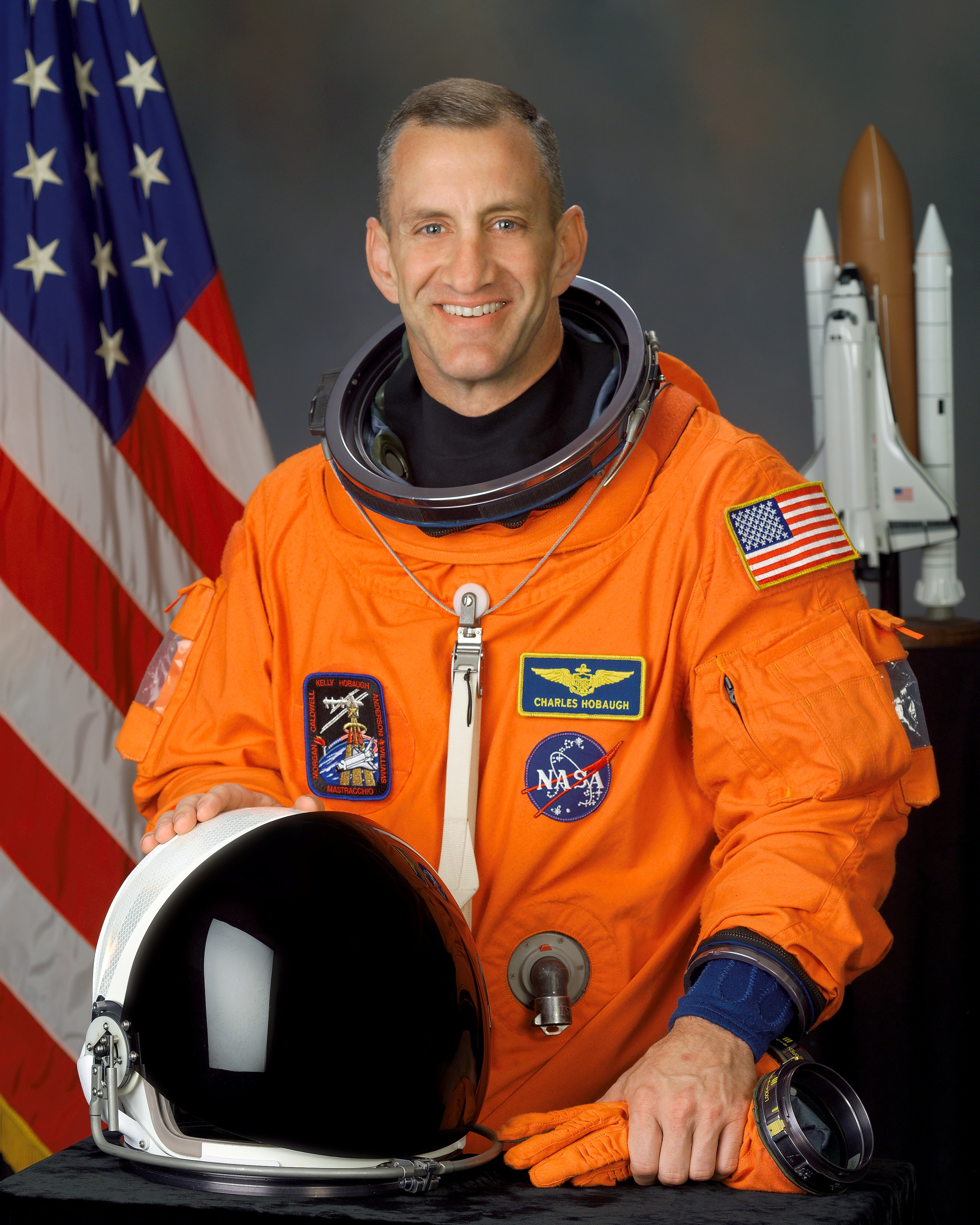
- Born: Charles Owen Hobaugh; November 5, 1961 (age 64); Bar Harbor, Maine, U.S.
- Education: United States Naval Academy (BS); University of Tennessee, Tullahoma
- Space career

NASA astronaut
- Rank: Colonel, USMC
- Time in space: 36d 7h 47m
- Selection: NASA Group 16 (1996)
- Missions: STS-104; STS-118; STS-129
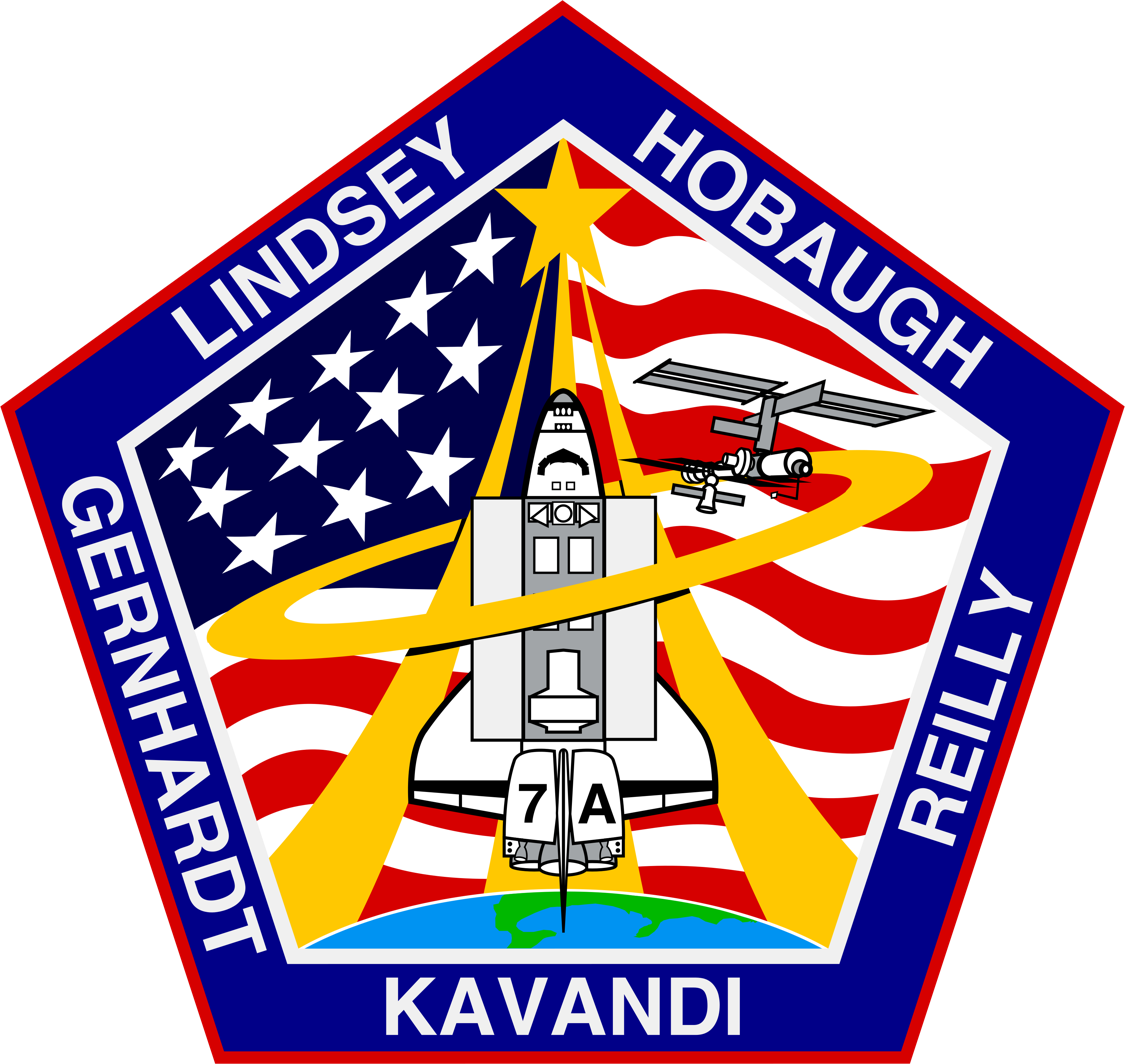
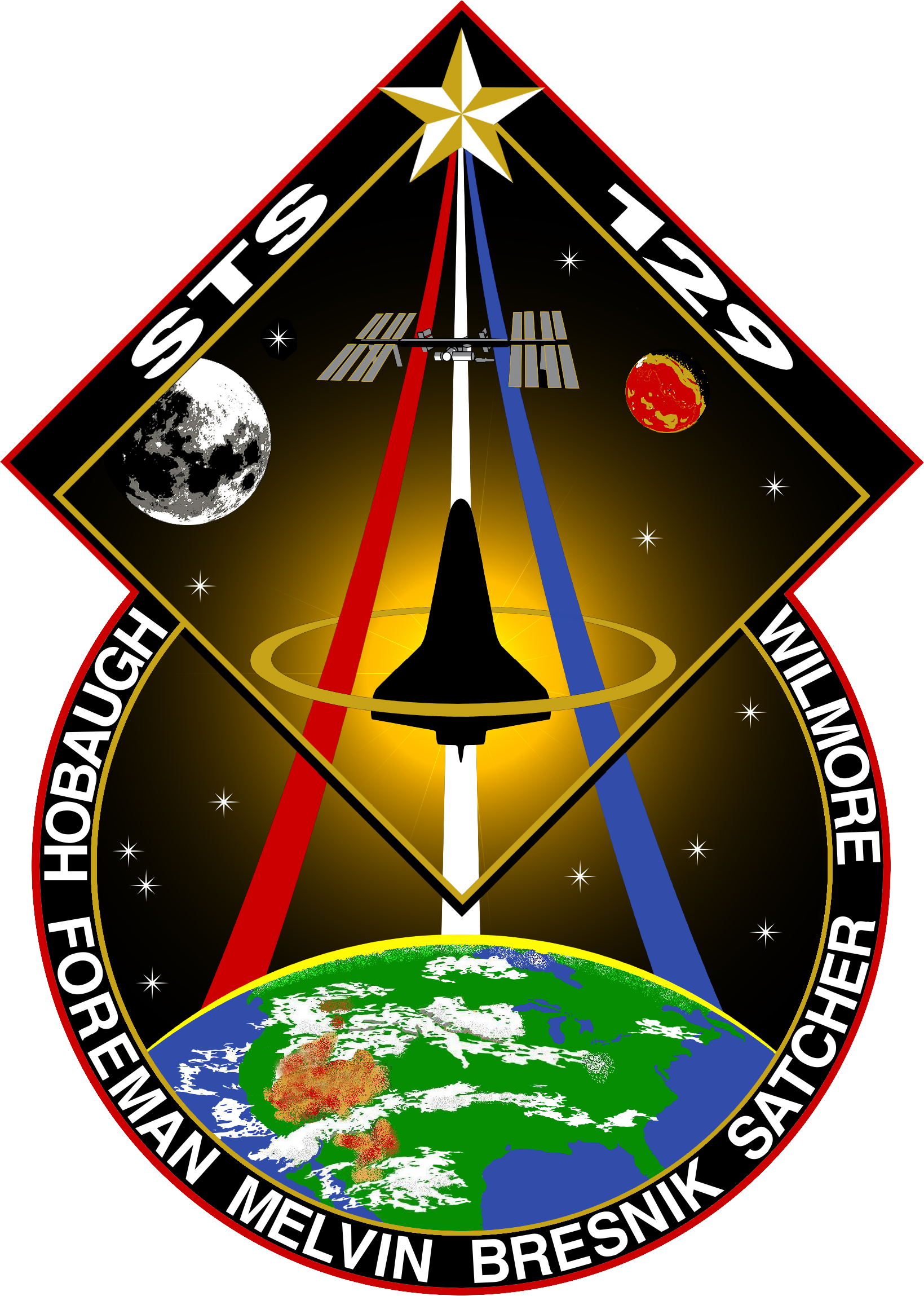
- Mission insignia
- Retired: June 2013

Charles Owen Hobaugh (born November 5, 1961) is a former NASA astronaut and a retired U.S. Marine Corps officer. He has had three spaceflights, all of which were Space Shuttle missions to the International Space Station, lasting between 10 and 13 days.

Hobaugh was selected to be an astronaut in 1996, and his first spaceflight was STS-104, for which he was designated pilot of Space Shuttle Atlantis. That mission took place in July 2001, less than a year after the space station received its first long-duration crew. His most recent spaceflight was in November 2009, STS-129 on Atlantis again; this time he was designated commander. In total, he has logged 36 days in space.

== Education ==
In 1980 he graduated from North Ridgeville High School, North Ridgeville, Ohio. In 1984 he received a Bachelor of Science degree in Aerospace Engineering from the United States Naval Academy. From January 1993 to August 1994 he attended the University of Tennessee Space Institute. He is a member of the U.S. Naval Academy Alumni Association.

== Awards and honors ==
Hobaugh has received several awards and honors, including those listed below.

- U.S. Naval Academy Distinguished Graduate
- Joe Foss Award for Advanced Jet Training
- U.S. Naval Test Pilot School Distinguished Graduate
- Strike/Flight Air Medal
- Navy and Marine Corps Achievement Medal
- Combat Action Ribbon
- Navy Unit Commendation

== Military career ==
Hobaugh received his commission as a Second Lieutenant in the United States Marine Corps upon graduation from the U.S. Naval Academy in May 1984. He graduated from The Basic School in December 1984. After a six-month temporary assignment at the Naval Air Systems Command, he reported to Naval Aviation Training Command and was designated a Naval Aviator in February 1987. He then reported to VMAT-203 for initial AV-8B Harrier training. Upon completion of this training, he was assigned to VMA-331 and made overseas deployments to Marine Corps Air Station Iwakuni, Japan, and flew combat missions in the Persian Gulf during Operation Desert Storm embarked aboard the USS Nassau. While assigned to VMA-331, he attended Marine Aviation Warfare and Tactics Instructor Course and was subsequently assigned as the Squadron Weapons and Tactics Instructor. Hobaugh was selected for U.S. Naval Test Pilot School and began the course in June 1991.

After graduation in June 1992, he was assigned to the Strike Aircraft Test Directorate as an AV-8 Project Officer and as the ASTOVL/JAST/JSF Program Officer. While there, he flew the AV-8B, YAV-8B (VSRA) and A-7E. In July 1994, he went back to the Naval Test Pilot School as an instructor in the Systems Department, where he flew the F-18, T-2 Buckeye, U-6A and gliders. Hobaugh was assigned to the U.S. Naval Test Pilot School when he was selected for the astronaut program. In September 2010 he retired from the U.S. Marine Corps.

Hobaugh has logged over 5,000 flight hours in more than 40 different aircraft and has over 200 V/STOL shipboard landings.

== NASA career ==
Selected by NASA in April 1996, Hobaugh reported to the Johnson Space Center in August 1996. He completed two years of training and evaluation, and was qualified for flight assignment as a pilot. Hobaugh was initially assigned technical duties in the Astronaut Office Spacecraft Systems/Operations Branch. Projects included Landing and Rollout, evaluator in the Shuttle Avionics Integration Laboratory (SAIL), Advanced Projects, Multifunction Electronics Display Enhancements, Advanced and Upgrade, Rendezvous and Close Proximity Operations and Visiting Vehicles prior to his first flight assignment. Most recently, he served as Capsule Communicator, working in the Mission Control Center as the voice to the crew.

Hobaugh was the launch and reentry and landing CAPCOM for the STS-107 mission in 2003, on which the Space Shuttle Columbia was destroyed on reentry. He spoke the words "Columbia, Houston. UHF Comm Check" several times after Mission Control had lost contact with Columbia.

=== STS-104 ===
Hobaugh flew as the pilot of STS-104 (Atlantis) (July 12–24, 2001). This mission was the tenth mission to the International Space Station (ISS). During the 13-day flight the crew conducted joint operations with the Expedition 2 crew and performed three spacewalks to install the Quest Joint Airlock and to outfit it with four high-pressure gas tanks. The mission was accomplished in 200 Earth orbits, traveling 5.3 million miles in 306 hours and 35 minutes.

=== STS-118 ===
He flew as pilot on STS-118 (Endeavour) in August 2007 for 13 days. This was the first flight of Shuttle Endeavour since the Columbia Disaster (its previous flight was the last flight before the Columbia Disaster, STS-113). The STS-118 mission delivered and assembled the starboard S5 truss segment of the International Space Station, as well as External Stowage Platform 3, (ESP-3) and a replacement Control Moment Gyroscope (CMG). The mission was also the final flight to include the Spacehab Logistics Single Module.

=== STS-129 ===
Hobaugh served as commander on the STS-129 mission aboard Space Shuttle Atlantis for 10 days in November 2009. It was the last Shuttle mission of the first decade of the 2000s. STS-129 focused on staging spare components outside the station. The 11-day flight included three spacewalks. The payload bay carried two large ExPRESS Logistics Carriers holding two spare gyroscopes, two nitrogen tank assemblies, two pump modules, an ammonia tank assembly, a spare latching end effector for the station's robotic arm, a spare trailing umbilical system for the Mobile Transporter, and a high-pressure gas tank. STS-129 was the first flight of an ExPRESS Logistics Carrier.

== Civilian career ==
Hobaugh was hired by FedEx in 2011.

== Personal life ==
Hobaugh was married to the former Corinna Lynn Leaman of East Petersburg, Pennsylvania; they have four children. The couple divorced in 2019. He enjoys weight lifting, volleyball, boating, water skiing, snow skiing, soccer, bicycling, running, rowing and competing in triathlons.

== See also ==
- STS-104
- STS-118
- STS-129
