= Lisa Nowak =

American astronaut (born 1963)

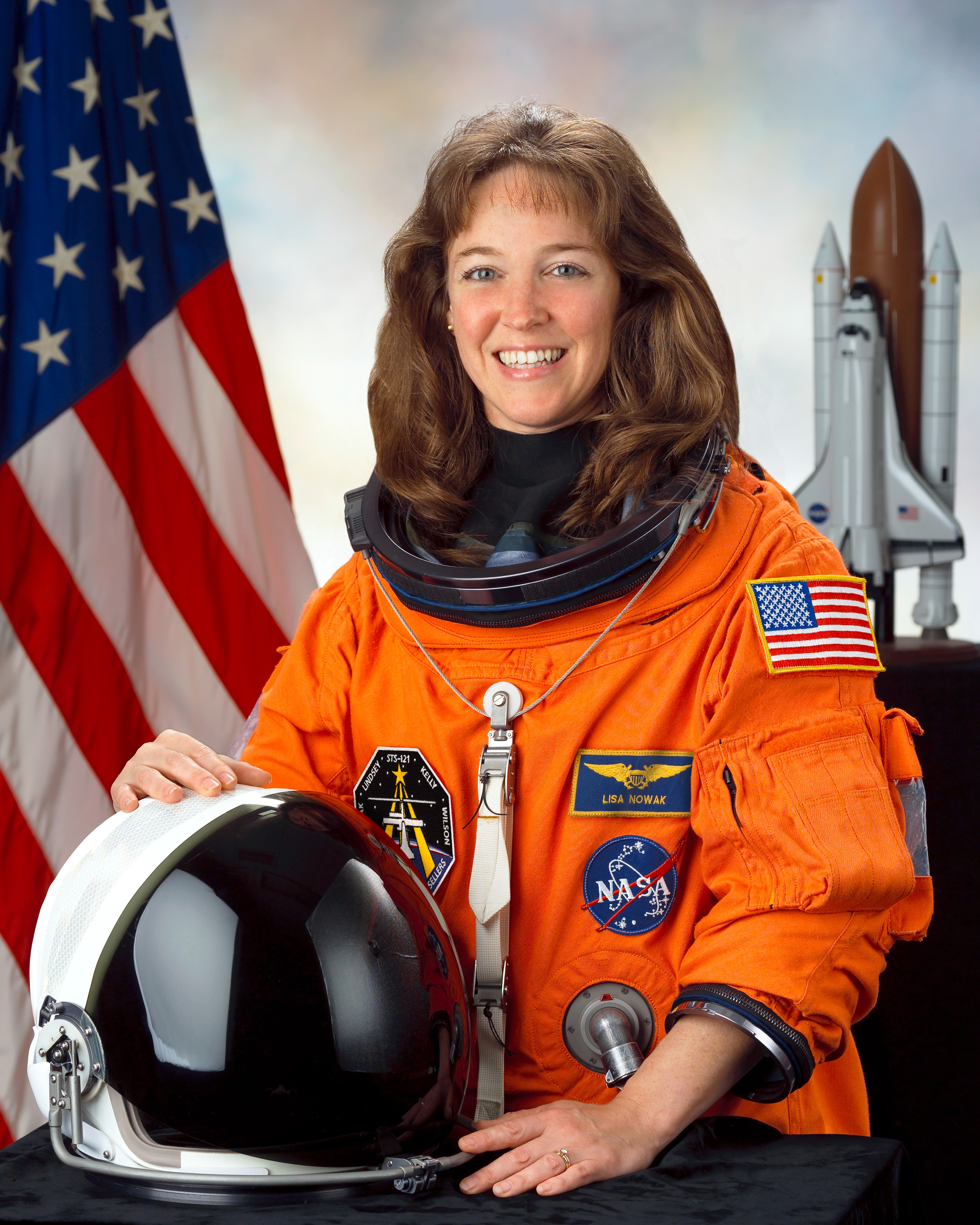
- Nowak in 2005
- Born: Lisa Marie Caputo; May 10, 1963 (age 63); Washington, D.C., U.S.
- Education: United States Naval Academy (BS); Naval Postgraduate School (MS)
- Awards: Defense Meritorious Service Medal; Navy Commendation Medal; Navy Achievement Medal; NASA Space Flight Medal (2)
- Space career

NASA astronaut
- Rank: Captain, USN
- Time in space: 12d 18h 36m
- Selection: NASA Group 16 (1996)
- Missions: STS-121

Lisa Marie Nowak (née Caputo; born May 10, 1963) is an American aeronautical engineer, former NASA astronaut, and retired United States Navy officer. Nowak served as naval flight officer and flight test engineer in the Navy, and was selected by NASA for NASA Astronaut Group 16 in 1996, qualifying as a mission specialist in robotics. She flew in space aboard Space Shuttle Discovery during the STS-121 mission in July 2006, when she was responsible for operating the robotic arms of the shuttle and the International Space Station. In 2007, Nowak was involved in a highly publicized incident of criminal misconduct for which she eventually pleaded guilty to felony burglary and misdemeanor battery charges, resulting in her demotion from captain to commander, termination by NASA, and forced retirement from the Navy.

Born in Washington, D.C., Nowak graduated from the United States Naval Academy in Annapolis, Maryland, in 1985. She was assigned to VAQ-34 at Naval Air Station Point Mugu, California, where she flew the EA-7L Corsair and ERA-3B Skywarrior. She earned a Master of Science degree in aeronautical engineering and a degree in aeronautical and astronautical engineering from the Naval Postgraduate School in Monterey, California. In 1993 she was selected to attend the U.S. Naval Test Pilot School at Naval Air Station Patuxent River, Maryland. After graduation, she remained at Patuxent River, flying in the F/A-18 Hornet and EA-6B Prowler. During her Navy career she logged over 1,500 hours in more than 30 aircraft and was awarded the Defense Meritorious Service Medal, the Navy Commendation Medal and the Navy Achievement Medal.

In February 2007, Nowak was arrested in Orlando, Florida, after she accosted and pepper-sprayed Colleen Shipman, a U.S. Air Force captain romantically involved with astronaut William Oefelein, who had been in a relationship with Nowak. She was released on bail and initially pleaded not guilty to the charges, which included attempted kidnapping, burglary with assault, and battery. Subsequently, her assignment as an astronaut was terminated by NASA. In 2009, Nowak agreed to a plea deal with prosecutors and pleaded guilty to charges of felony burglary of a car and misdemeanor battery. She remained a Navy captain until the following year when a Naval Board of Inquiry voted unanimously to reduce her in rank to commander and to retire her from the Navy under other than honorable conditions after 25 years of service.

== Early life and education ==
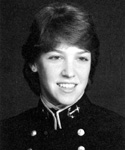
Caputo as an Annapolis midshipman

Lisa Marie Caputo was born in Washington, D.C., on May 10, 1963, to Alfredo F. Caputo, a computer consultant, and Jane L. Caputo, a biological specialist. Caputo and her two younger sisters, Andrea and Marisa, grew up in Rockville, Maryland. In 1969, she watched the Apollo 11 Moon mission and became interested in the space program. While growing up, she followed the Space Shuttle program, particularly the introduction of female astronauts in 1978, and paid frequent visits to the National Air and Space Museum.

Caputo was educated at Luxmanor Elementary School, Tilden Middle School, and Charles W. Woodward High School in North Bethesda, Maryland. In the January of her junior year of high school, she told her mother that she was going to become an astronaut. She was a Girl Scout, and a member of the Société Honoraire de Français, which required students to maintain an A average in French and a B average in all other subjects. She competed on the math team and served on her class student council. She played field hockey and competed in track and field athletics. In 1981 she was named Student Athlete of the Year, a school award granted to the student who excelled most in both sports and academics, and graduated as co-valedictorian. In her final year of high school, Caputo was accepted by Brown University, a private Ivy League university in Providence, Rhode Island, and by the United States Naval Academy in Annapolis, Maryland. Her parents thought Brown was the best choice, but Caputo felt that she had more chance of achieving her goal of becoming an astronaut by going to the Naval Academy.

Women were first admitted to Annapolis in 1976, and by the time Caputo entered as a plebe in 1981, there were women in each of the four classes, but were only 6 percent of the student body. Female midshipmen were still harassed by some male classmates in 1981, and occasionally a male professor would inform a class that he did not think women belonged there. As a student, she competed on the track team. She graduated on May 22, 1985, with a Bachelor of Science degree in aeronautical engineering, and was commissioned as an ensign in the United States Navy.

== Navy career ==
For her first assignment, Caputo chose a six-month secondment to the Johnson Space Center, where she worked as an aerospace engineer at its branch at Ellington Air Force Base near Houston, Texas. During this time, there were six Space Shuttle launches. "What impressed me", she later said, "was the whole idea that everybody was so into what they were doing and excited that each of their parts was so important."

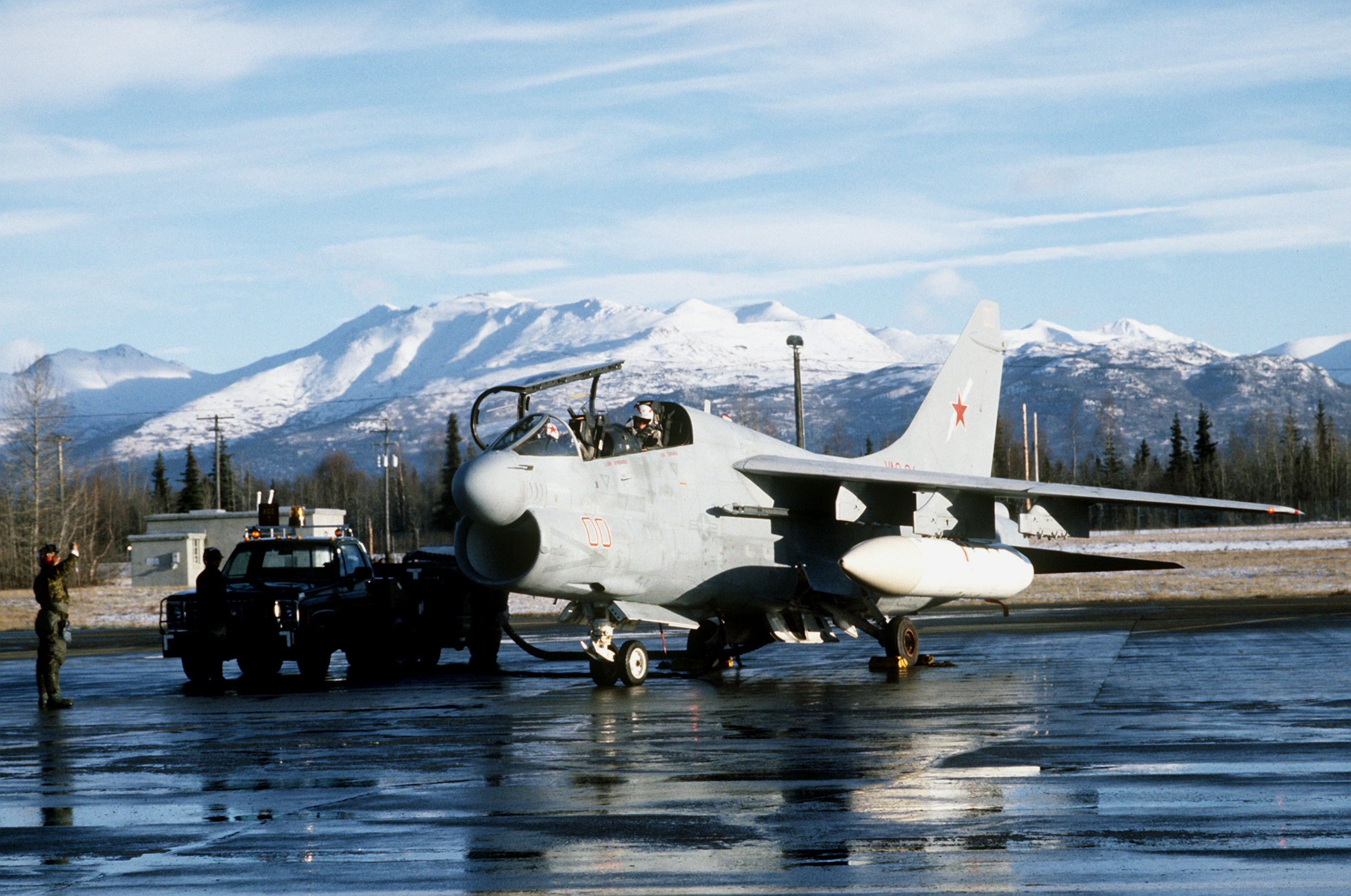
An LTV EA-7L Corsair II of VAQ-34 in 1987

In December 1985, Caputo received orders to report to Naval Air Station Pensacola in Florida for flight training. By law, women were still banned from combat assignments, so half the jobs in the Navy were unavailable to women regardless of aptitude or ability, and there were doubts about the wisdom of training women for jobs they were not permitted to do. Getting accepted into flight training was a major achievement, and those women that did so were often resented by men who were passed over. Caputo completed primary flight training at Naval Air Station Pensacola on the T-2 Buckeye, T-39 Sabreliner and TA-4J Skyhawk and qualified as a naval flight officer (NFO) in June 1987.

Caputo's NFO training continued at the Electronic Warfare School at Corry Station in preparation to fly electronic warfare aircraft. She then went to the Naval Air Station Lemoore, where she qualified to operate the electronic systems on the LTV EA-7L Corsair II. On April 6, 1988, she married an Annapolis classmate, Richard T. Nowak, at the Naval Academy Chapel with Catholic rites, and changed her last name to "Nowak". Her next assignment was to Electronic Warfare Aggressor Squadron 34 (VAQ-34) at Naval Air Station Point Mugu, California, where she flew on both the Corsair II and the Douglas ERA-3B Skywarrior, supporting the U.S. Pacific Fleet on reconnaissance mission exercises. She qualified as a mission commander and electronic warfare lead.

In 1990, Nowak entered the U.S. Naval Postgraduate School in Monterey, California, where she earned both a Master of Science degree in aeronautical engineering and a degree in aeronautical and astronautical engineering in September 1992, writing a thesis on Computational Investigations of a NACA 0012 Airfoil in Low Reynolds Number Flows. She gave birth to a son in February 1992. After graduate school, she transferred to the restricted line as an Aerospace Engineering Duty Officer. She was selected to attend the United States Naval Test Pilot School at Naval Air Station Patuxent River, Maryland, after she applied six times. She graduated in June 1994, and then became an aircraft systems project officer at the Air Combat Environment Test and Evaluation Facility and at Strike Aircraft Test Squadron at Patuxent River. As a naval flight officer/flight test engineer, she participated in the development of the F/A-18 Hornet and EA-6B Prowler. Her next assignment was to the Naval Air Systems Command, where she was involved in the acquisition of new systems for naval aircraft. During her career in the Navy, Nowak logged over 1,500 hours of flight time in more than 30 different aircraft and was awarded the Defense Meritorious Service Medal, the Navy Commendation Medal and the Navy Achievement Medal.

== NASA career ==
=== Astronaut training ===
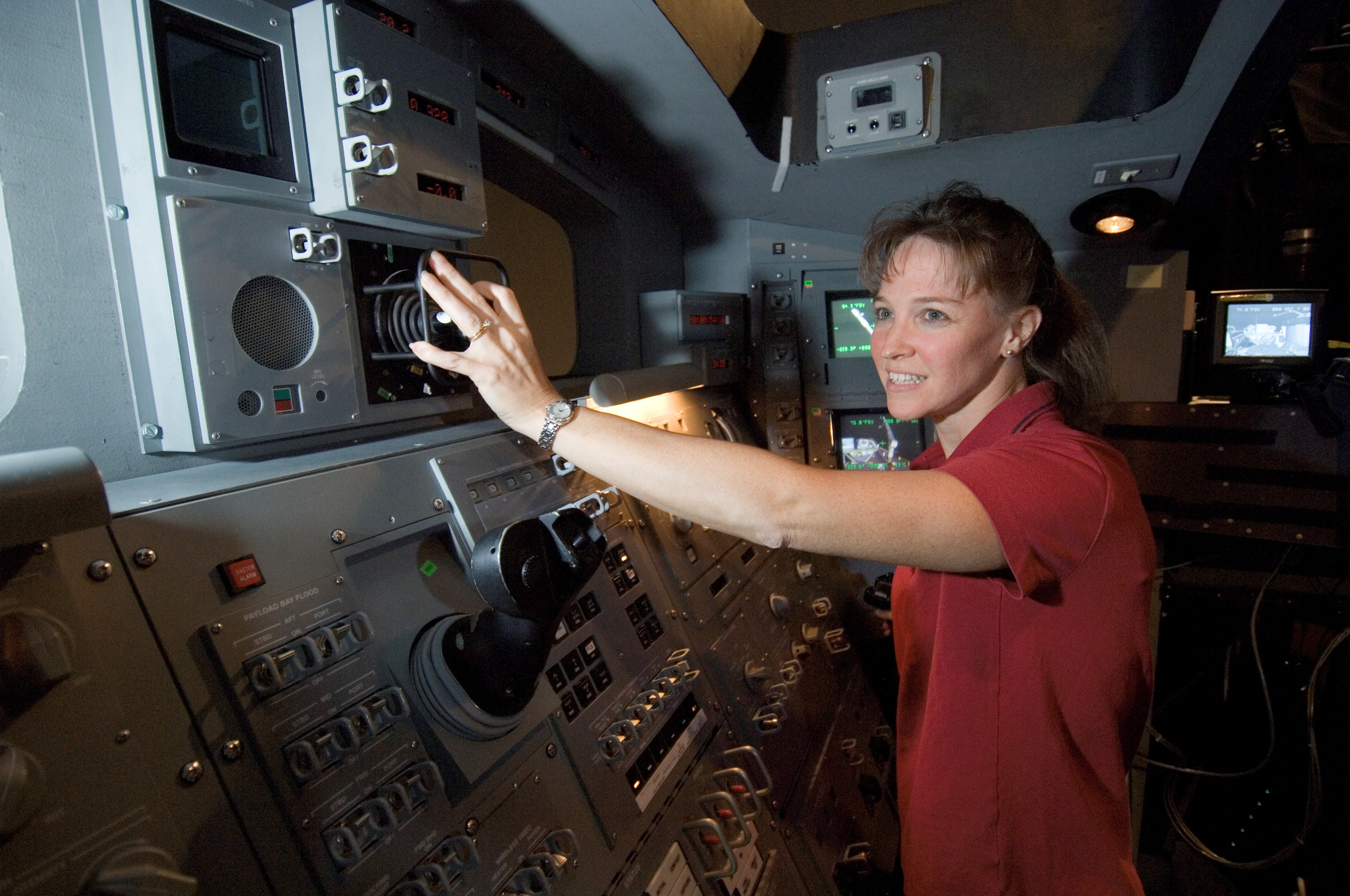
Nowak in the systems engineering simulator

On June 15, 1995, NASA announced that it was selecting a new group of astronauts. As a naval officer, Nowak could not apply directly, like a civilian could, but had to submit her application to a review board that would then approve it and forward it on to NASA, which it did. NASA received over 2,400 applications, and in early 1996, Nowak was informed that she was one of 150 finalists deemed highly qualified, and she was asked to report to Johnson Space Center for a week of orientation, interviews and medical evaluations.

On May 1, 1996, NASA publicly announced the names of 10 pilot and 25 mission specialist candidates; Nowak was one of the latter. The class of 1996, the 16th group of NASA astronauts, was the largest selected since the first class of Space Shuttle astronauts in 1978, which also numbered 35. They were ordered to report for duty at Johnson Space Center to commence their astronaut training on August 12, 1996. They were joined by nine international astronauts. Because there were so many of them, they were often packed into classrooms and training facilities, and called themselves "The Sardines".

Nowak and her family moved to Texas, where they built a house in Clear Lake City. Her husband, another naval flight officer, left active duty in 1998 but continued to fly in the United States Naval Reserve. He found a job as a space communications contractor with Barrios Technology, an aerospace company, and worked at the Johnson Space Center as a flight controller at the mission control center.

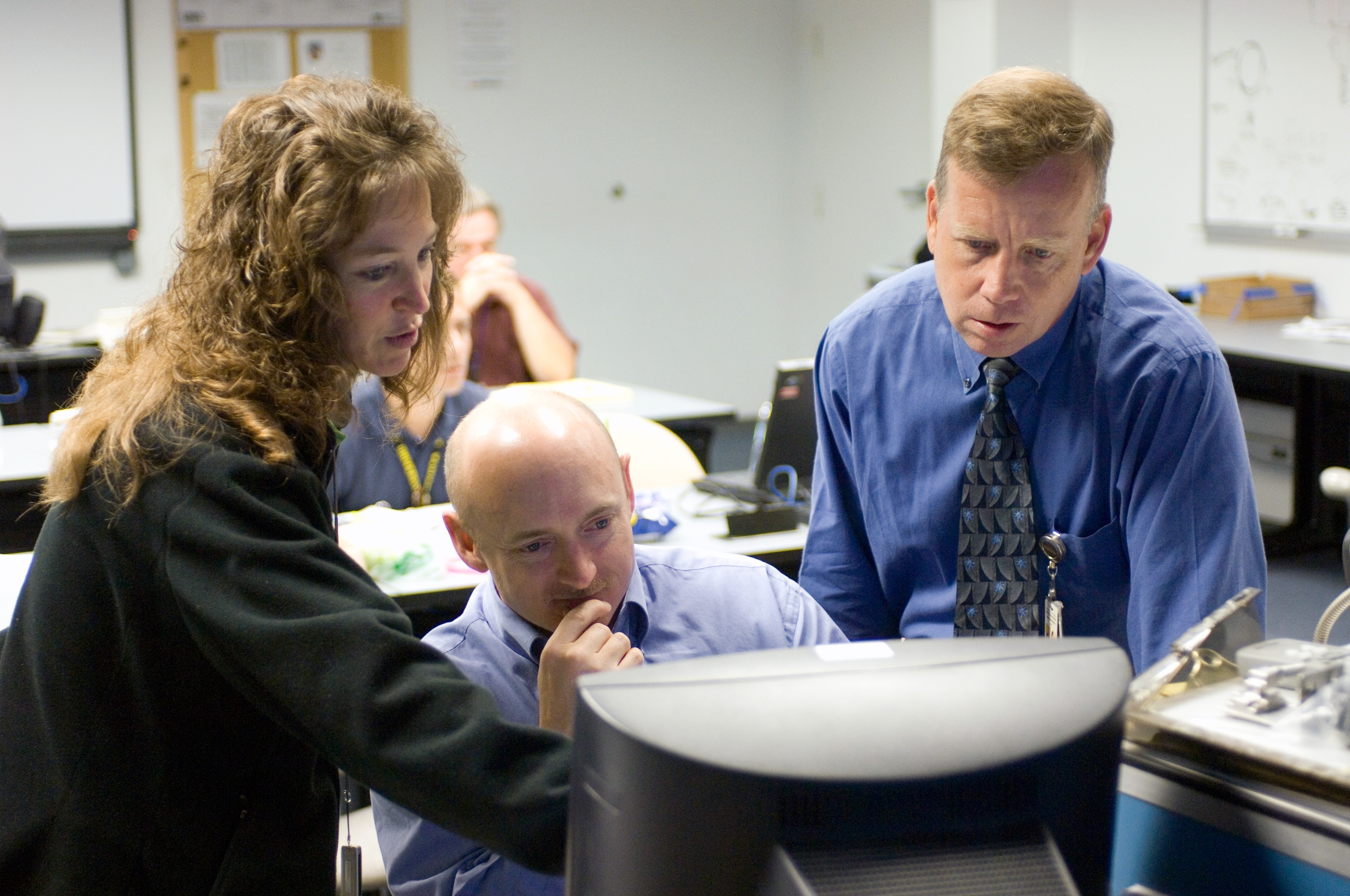
Nowak reviews data on a computer monitor with Mark Kelly (center) and Steven W. Lindsey (right) during a training session at the Neutral Buoyancy Laboratory.

Astronaut training included survival training, a three-day trip to the Grand Canyon to study geology, and classwork on the Space Shuttle's many systems. As a mission specialist, she was expected to fly a minimum of four hours a month in NASA's Northrop T-38 Talon aircraft. Training was conducted in the waters of the Weightless Environment Training Facility and in the Boeing KC-135 Stratotanker known as the Vomit Comet that flies a trajectory that gives the sensation of being in space. She completed her astronaut training in August 1998. On September 28, 1998, she returned to Annapolis along with fellow astronaut alumni Jim Lovell, Charles O. Hobaugh, David Leestma, John M. Lounge, Bryan D. O'Connor and Pierre J. Thuot, for a celebration of the life of Mercury Seven astronaut Alan Shepard, who had died two months before.

In early 2001, Nowak became pregnant with twins. At the Astronaut Office, Nowak specialized in the operation of the Space Shuttle's robotic arm. She also served with the CAPCOM Branch, the astronauts that worked with the mission control center as the primary communicators with the spacecraft. She performed this duty during the STS-100 mission in April 2001, when the crew of the Space Shuttle Endeavour installed a robot arm in the International Space Station (ISS). In October 2001, she gave birth to twin daughters. Nowak and her husband alternated their work schedules so one of them was always with the children. This arrangement lasted until Richard was recalled to active duty in 2002 to participate in Operation Enduring Freedom, which effectively left Nowak a single mother with three young children.

On December 12, 2002, NASA announced the crew for STS-118, a mission scheduled for November 2003. Scott Kelly would be the mission commander, Hobaugh the pilot, and the mission specialists would be Nowak, Scott Parazynski, Dafydd Williams, and Barbara Morgan. The Space Shuttle Columbia disaster on February 1, 2003, killed seven astronauts on the STS-107 mission, including three from Nowak's 1996 astronaut class. It was NASA's practice to provide the families of astronauts who had died with a personal casualty assistance officer, and Nowak performed this duty for the family of her close friend Laurel Clark. Clark's widower, Jonathan Clark, a former NASA flight surgeon, recalled that:

She did everything. She went through everything: Navy paperwork, finances, bills, bank accounts. She took care of [Clark's son] Iain during the months afterward. She saw what it was like to lose one of her best friends and for Iain to lose a mother. And the thing is, while Lisa was doing this, she was not at home with her kids. She has two very young children and she is here twelve to fourteen hours a day under the most difficult circumstances. I have to think it was hugely stressful.

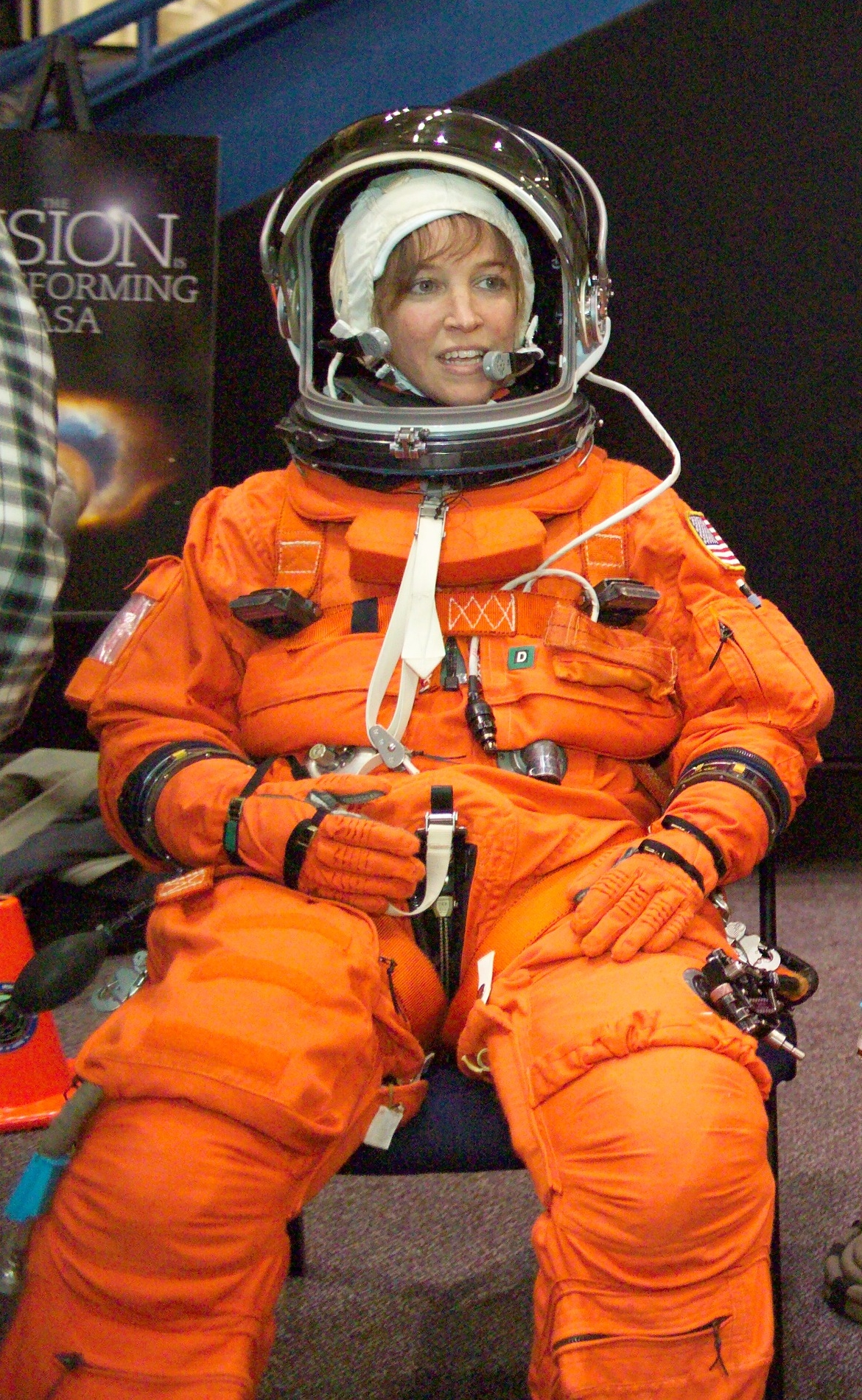
Nowak during astronaut training in 2005

The disaster resulted in a series of schedule and hardware changes. The task of testing all the changes was assigned to STS-114, the Return to Flight mission, but the list of changes that required testing grew so large that a second Return to Flight mission was added to the schedule to accommodate them. Despite the numbering, this mission, STS-121, would be the second mission flown after the Columbia disaster. STS-121 was primarily concerned with testing and developing new hardware and procedures to make Space Shuttle flights safer. It would also re-supply the ISS with equipment and consumables.

In January 2004, Nowak participated in an eleven-day cold weather survival training course in Canada with fellow NASA astronauts Dominic Antonelli and William Oefelein, Swedish astronaut Christer Fuglesang, Russian cosmonaut Dmitri Kondratyev, and Canadian astronaut (and future Governor General) Julie Payette. The course commenced on January 19, and included four days of instruction with the Canadian Armed Forces. They were then dropped off in the wilderness in northern Quebec and had to make their way back on foot. They covered 20 kilometers (12 mi) in eleven days, completing the course on January 29. Nowak had worked together with Oefelein, who had been selected as an astronaut with the class of 1998, when they were both stationed at Patuxent River in 1995.

When Nowak and Oefelein returned to Houston they began an extramarital affair, which they attempted to conceal. As serving Navy officers, they could have been charged with conduct unbecoming an officer and a gentleman, which includes adultery, under the Uniform Code of Military Justice. Oefelein's wife filed for divorce in February 2005 after discovering emails between him and Nowak. Their divorce was finalized in May 2005. Oefelein moved into a small apartment, to which he gave Nowak a key. She left personal effects there, and she soon became a familiar sight to other residents of the complex.

=== Space flight ===
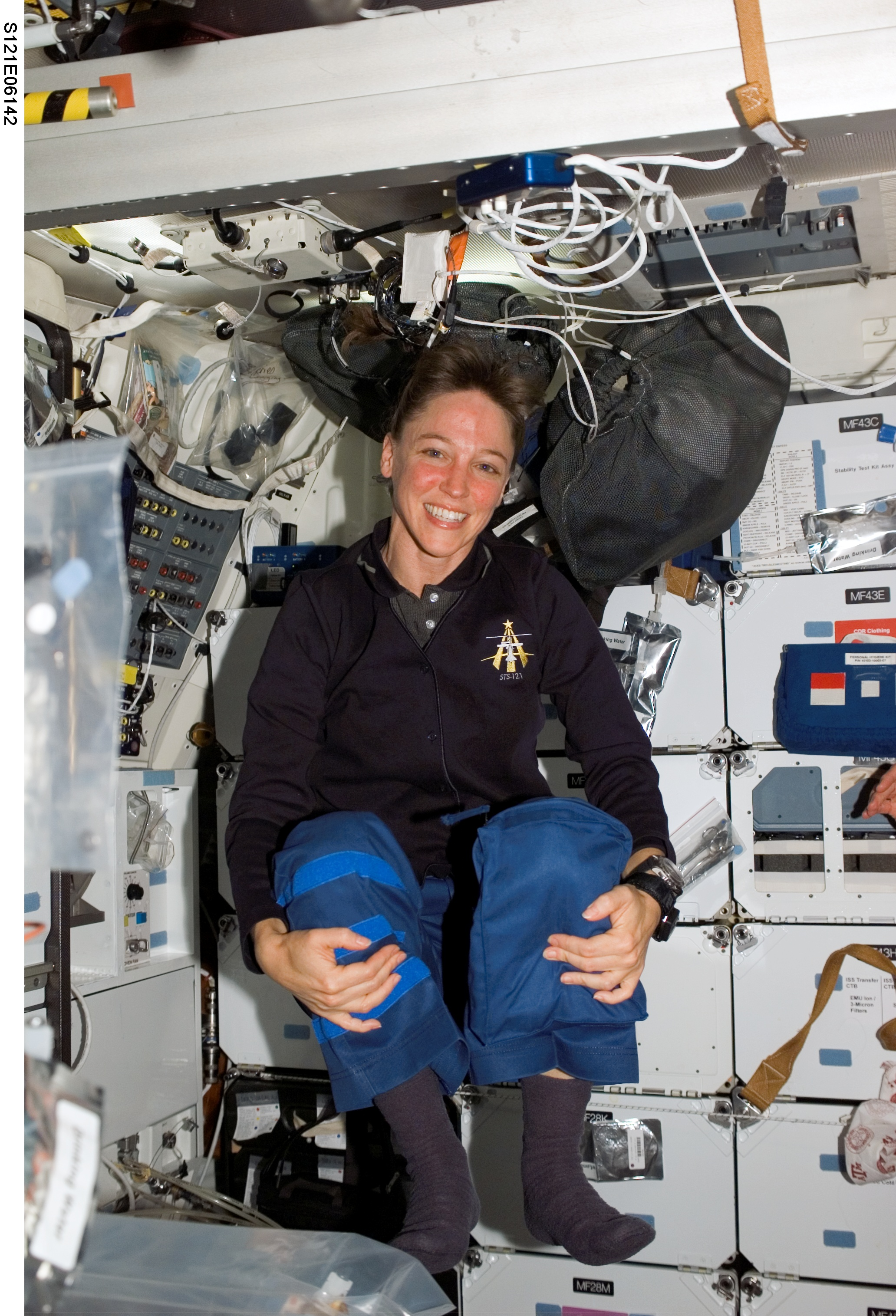
Nowak floats on the middeck of the Space Shuttle Discovery.

NASA announced in December 2003 that STS-121 would be commanded by Steven Lindsey, with Mark Kelly as pilot and Michael Fossum and Carlos Noriega as mission specialists. On November 18, 2004, NASA announced that Nowak and her classmate Stephanie Wilson would join the STS-121 crew as additional mission specialists. They were assigned the task of manipulating the robotic arms of the Space Shuttle and the ISS. The STS-121 mission was originally scheduled for March or April 2005, but was soon postponed to July owing to difficulty implementing all the changes required. During the launch of Space Shuttle Discovery for STS-114 in July 2005, debris separated from the external tank, the very problem which had caused the loss of the Space Shuttle Columbia, and STS-121 was further postponed until a solution to the problem could be found. In February 2006, the mission was rescheduled for a launch window between May 3 and 22, but in March multiple problems forced a further postponement until July.

A prelaunch reception was held for Nowak at the Kennedy Space Center Visitor Complex, and she was joined by her parents, her husband Richard and three children, family members, and friends from school, Annapolis and the Navy. Among the personal effects she packed for the flight was a small owl figurine of the mascot of Luxmanor Elementary School, a koozie from Tilden Middle School, a banner from Charles W. Woodward High School, an Annapolis Class of 1985 flag, and her grandmother's engagement ring.

On July 1, 2006, the STS-121 crew ate the traditional prelaunch cake decorated with the mission's insignia and boarded Discovery at Kennedy Space Center Launch Complex 39B. Nowak was the last crew member to enter the spacecraft, taking her seat as the flight engineer on the flight deck immediately behind Lindsey and Kelly. At 15:42, the launch was scrubbed due to thunderstorm activity in the area. A second launch attempt the following day was also canceled due to inclement weather. STS-121 successfully launched on July 4 at 14:38. It was the first time a Space Shuttle launch had taken place on Independence Day.

After she entered orbit, Nowak felt nauseated, a symptom of space adaptation syndrome. The first day in space was devoted to inspecting the orbiter for possible damage, as the crew had noticed debris falling off the external tank during liftoff. Nowak deployed the robotic arm to inspect the wing tips, nose and underside of the spacecraft using digital and video cameras and laser scanning. After six and a half hours of examination, all that was found was a white splotch on the nose cap. NASA engineers were initially concerned that this might be the result of a high-velocity impact, but after closer examination they determined it to be bird droppings. Some discoloration found on the leading edges was attributed to hydraulic fluid spills.

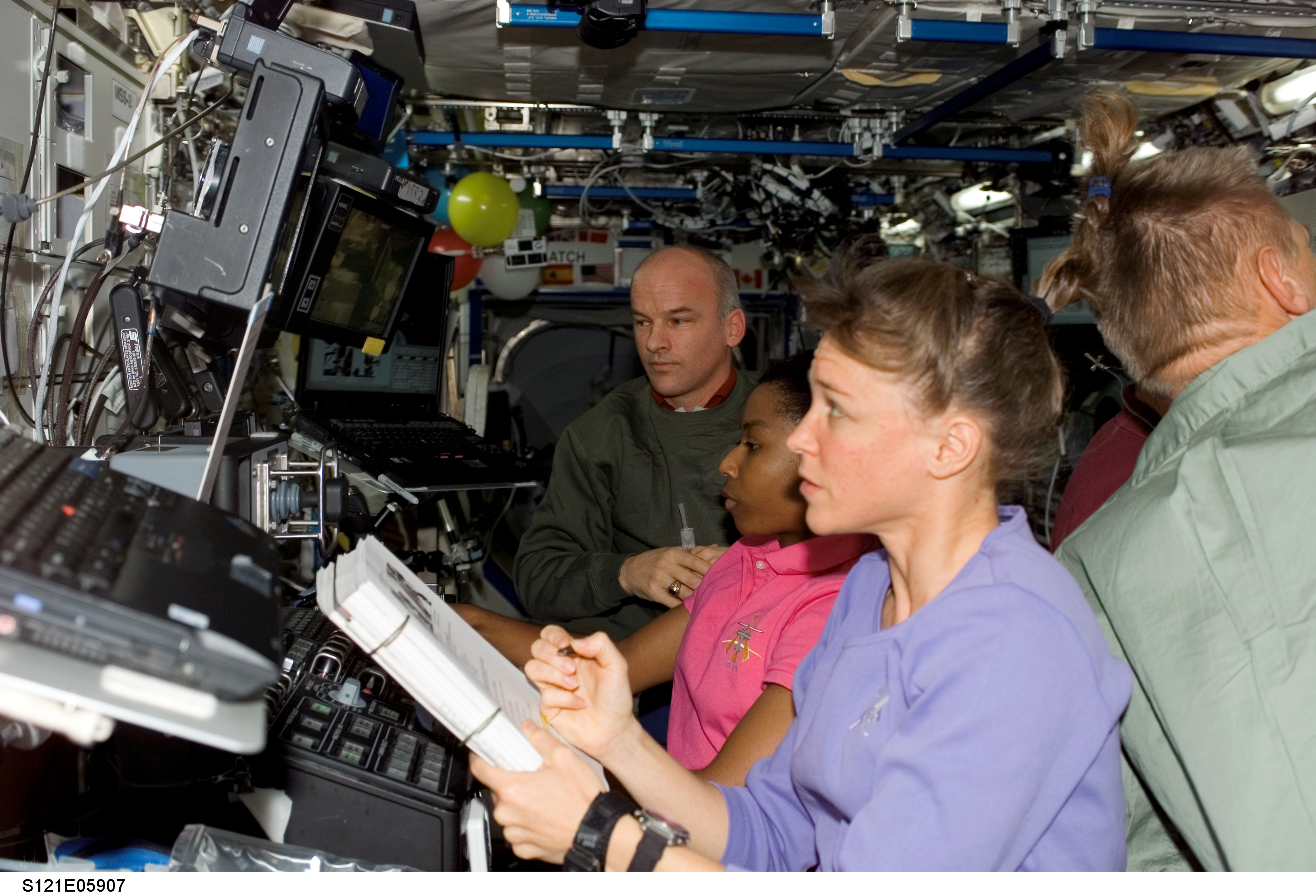
Nowak assists Stephanie Wilson with using the Canadarm2 controls to move the Leonardo module on the International Space Station.

After Discovery docked with the ISS, Wilson and Nowak used the Canadarm to unload the Italian-built Leonardo Multi-Purpose Logistics Module (MPLM). The 3,400 kilograms (7,400 lb) of equipment and supplies it contained included the Minus Eighty Lab Freezer for use in scientific experiments and a 640-kilogram (1,400 lb) Oxygen Generation System to allow the ISS to support up to six crew members. Nowak carried out her assigned tasks, but other crew members noted a reluctance to assist with tasks that were not assigned to her and for which she had not trained.

While Discovery was docked with the ISS, the STS-121 crew conducted three spacewalks. The women were not considered for this activity; when NASA trimmed the space suit budget in the 1990s, small sizes were omitted. Women astronauts were assigned to other tasks like operating the robotic arms. From the Destiny laboratory on the ISS, Nowak operated the robotic arm whose installation she had overseen as CAPCOM years before. It was more challenging to operate than the one on the Space Shuttle, since it was larger and had an extra joint.

Some 2,000 kilograms (4,300 lb) of trash, experiment results and broken equipment were packed into Leonardo, and Nowak and Wilson used the robotic arm to re-stow the module in Discovery's cargo bay. It was then used to make a final check of the Space Shuttle to ensure that no damage had been done by micrometeorites or space debris. Discovery undocked from the ISS and commenced its two-day return to Earth. In all, she spent 12 days 18 hours and 36 minutes in space, during which she traveled 8 million kilometers (5 million miles). Discovery landed at the Shuttle Landing Facility at the Kennedy Space Center at 09:14 on July 17.

=== Homecoming ===
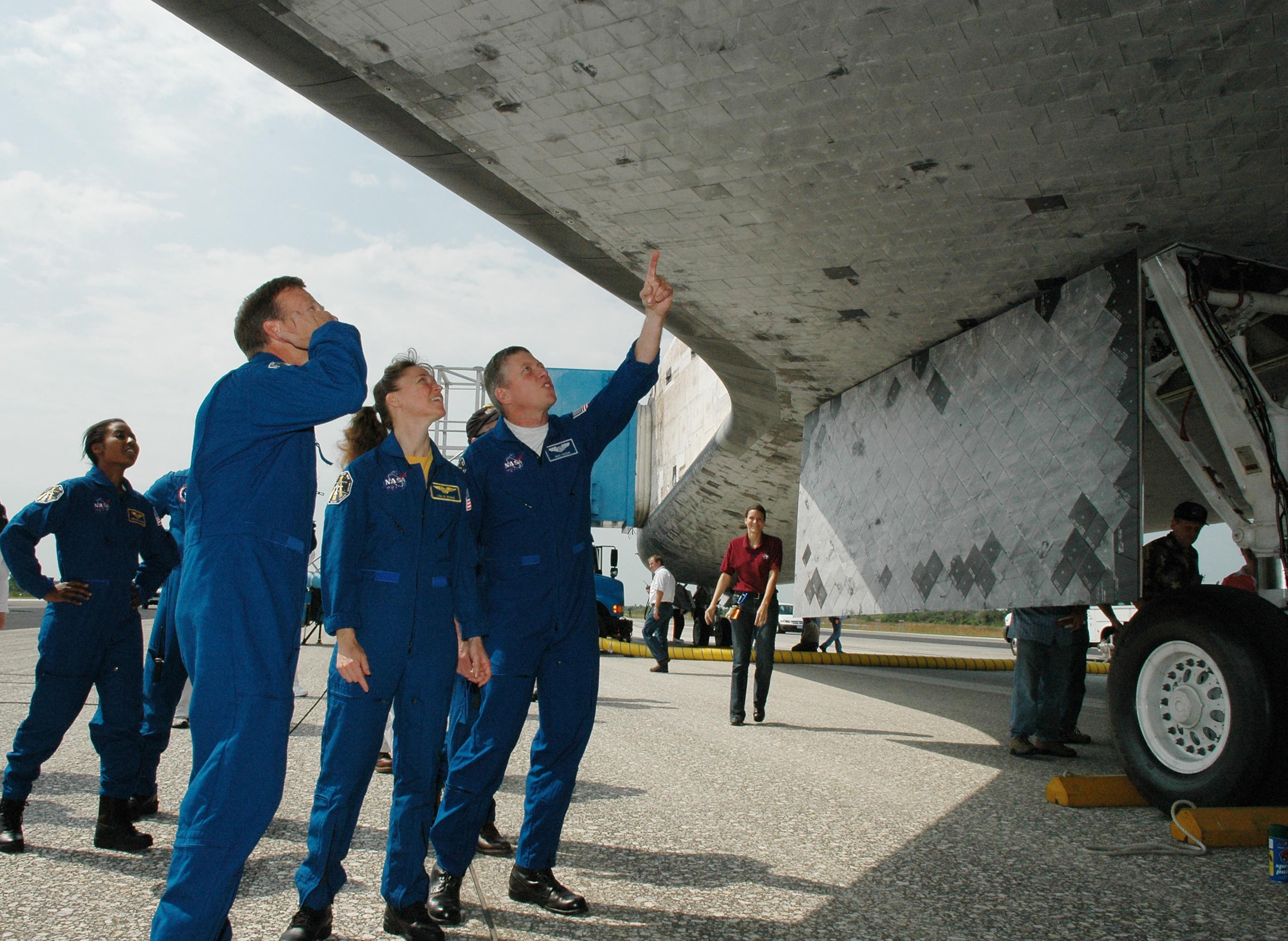
Nowak (center) and the rest of the STS-121 crew inspects the underside of the Space Shuttle Discovery after landing at the Kennedy Space Center.

As was usual, the six crew members of STS-121 embarked on a series of publicity events and interviews. They attended X Games XII at the Home Depot Center in Los Angeles from August 3 to 6, and the Houston Astros game on August 14 at Minute Maid Park, where the crew met pitcher Roger Clemens and threw ceremonial first pitches. On September 9, Nowak attended a tailgate party at the Naval Academy versus University of Massachusetts football game, where she gave her classmates the Class of 1985 flag she had carried on the Space Shuttle and signed photographs of herself. At half time she presented Annapolis with a Navy jersey she had carried on board Discovery. She gave a long interview with the Ladies' Home Journal for its Mother's Day issue and presented awards at NASA's Stennis Space Center. She went back to Luxmanor Elementary School and Tilden Middle School where she spoke to the children and attended celebrations at Annapolis for the 30th anniversary of its admission of women, during which she gave a presentation as part of the academy's Forrestal Lecture Series. In December, the STS-121 crew flew to the UK, where they visited the University of Edinburgh and the National Space Centre in Leicester, and spoke at the University of Leeds, fellow STS-121 crewmember Piers Sellers's alma mater.

== Orlando International Airport incident ==
=== Background ===
Nowak's marriage failed, and she separated from Richard in January 2007. Her relationship with Oefelein also cooled, although she continued to call him almost every day. In late 2006, Oefelein began a relationship with U.S. Air Force Captain Colleen Shipman, who worked as an engineer with the 45th Space Wing at Patrick Air Force Base in Florida. Oefelein informed Nowak about Shipman in January. He thought Nowak took it well, and that they could remain friends. They continued to train for the MS 150, a charity bicycle race, but Shipman became uncomfortable with Nowak's bicycle being kept at Oefelein's place. She asked him to have Nowak remove it.

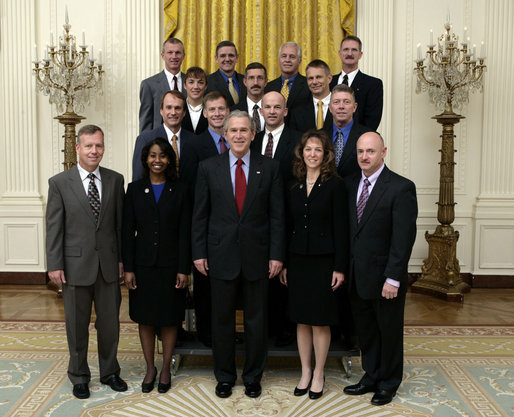
Nowak (front row, second from right) and the rest of the STS-121 crew with President George W. Bush

On January 29, 2007, NASA announced that Stephanie Wilson had been chosen as the mission specialist for the STS-120 mission to replace Michael Foreman, who had been reassigned to the STS-123 mission, scheduled for February. Nowak had hoped for this assignment. According to Mark Kelly, Wilson was chosen because "she was a team player and well deserving. Nowak was not." Nowak was assigned to CAPCOM duties for STS-123 instead.

=== Altercation ===
On February 4, 2007, Nowak packed latex gloves, a black wig, a BB pistol and ammunition, pepper spray, a hooded tan trench coat, a drilling hammer, black gloves, an 8-inch (200 mm) Gerber folding knife and other items. She drove her husband's car 900 miles (1,400 km) from Houston, Texas, to Orlando, Florida, to confront Shipman. Early police reports stated that she wore Maximum Absorbency Garments during the trip, but she later denied this. On February 5, 2007, Nowak traveled to Orlando International Airport and waited for Shipman's plane to touch down at 01:05. Shipman went to claim her suitcase, but it was delayed. Shipman finally collected her suitcase from the baggage claim office at 03:15 and took a shuttle bus to the parking area at 03:28.

Shipman said that after arriving, she became aware of someone following her to an airport satellite parking area. When she entered her car, she heard running footsteps and quickly locked the door. Nowak slapped the window and tried to open the car door, asked for a ride, then started crying. Shipman rolled down the window a couple of inches after which Nowak sprayed the pepper spray into the car. Shipman drove to the parking lot booth where she called the police. Several Orlando Police Department Airport Division officers arrived minutes later. An officer observed Nowak throwing a bag into a trash receptacle at a parking shuttle bus stop. Nowak was subsequently arrested at the airport on charges of attempted kidnapping, battery, attempted vehicle burglary with battery, and destruction of evidence.

In a handwritten request for a restraining order against Nowak after her arrest, Shipman referred to Nowak as an acquaintance of her boyfriend, but did not identify Oefelein. She claimed that Nowak had been stalking her for two months. Nowak told investigators she was involved in a relationship with Oefelein, which she described as being "more than a working relationship but less than a romantic relationship". Citing evidence of elaborate planning, disguises and weapons, police recommended she be held without bail.

=== Arraignment ===
Two fellow astronauts flew to Florida in T-38 jets for Nowak's arraignment: Captain Christopher Ferguson, the senior active duty Naval Officer in the NASA Astronaut Corps at the time, went as Nowak's commanding officer, and Steven Lindsey, the commander of Nowak's shuttle mission, went as Chief of the Astronaut Office, the senior astronaut at NASA. On February 6, 2007, both appeared before a judge on her behalf. The state's assistant attorney, Amanda Cowan, argued that the facts indicated a well-thought-out plan to kidnap and perhaps to injure Shipman. In arguing for pre-trial release, Nowak's attorney remarked, "One's good works must count for something."

Nowak was ordered released on $15,500 bail under the condition she wear a GPS tracking device and not contact Shipman, but before Nowak could be released, Orlando police charged Nowak with attempted first-degree murder and announced she would not be released on bail. Her lawyer alleged that police and prosecutors, unhappy that Nowak had been granted bail, pressed more serious charges solely to keep her in jail. In the second arraignment Nowak was charged with attempted first-degree murder with a deadly weapon, for which the judge raised bail by $10,000. After posting bail, Nowak was released from jail. Shipman dropped her request for a protection order on February 15.

=== Reactions ===
On February 6, 2007, Nowak was placed on 30-day leave by NASA. She returned to Houston on a commercial airline flight on February 8, and upon arrival was reportedly taken immediately under police escort to the Johnson Space Center for medical and psychiatric evaluation. Nowak's assignment to NASA as a serving Navy officer was terminated by the space agency on March 7, 2007. There was widespread public reaction to her arrest, concerns being expressed about NASA's astronaut selection and screening processes. Some commentators opined that NASA's presentation of astronauts as heroes was part of the problem.

In response to concerns over Nowak's mental health, NASA Administrator Michael D. Griffin commissioned the NASA Astronaut Health Care System Review Committee, an independent panel, to examine how well NASA attended to the mental health of its astronauts. Patricia Santy, a former NASA flight surgeon and the author of the book Choosing the Right Stuff: Psychological Selection of Astronauts and Cosmonauts, described a culture among the Astronaut Corps to avoid discussing physical and psychological issues with medical personnel, due to the perception that any issues could jeopardize one's career and flight status. Policies at NASA were changed in a variety of ways: flight surgeons would receive further training in psychiatric evaluation, and a new "Astronaut Code of Professional Responsibility" was issued. Behavioral health evaluations would be included in the astronauts' annual flight physicals.

=== Evidence ===
On April 10, 2007, Florida prosecutors released more material in the case. The previous week, the trial judge had agreed to unseal some of the documents that described items found in Nowak's car after her arrest. Among these items were a handwritten note on USS Nimitz stationery listing Shipman's flight information and one on "Flight Controller's Log" paper listing more than 24 items, including sneakers, plastic gloves, contacts, cash, an umbrella, and black sweats. A floppy disk contained two photographs of Nowak riding in a bicycle race, and 15 images depicting an unidentified woman in different stages of undress. An evidence report dated March 15 indicated that nearly all of the photographs and drawings depicted scenes of bondage. Also found were $585 and £41 (GBP) in cash, and four brown paper bags with 69 orange pills that were not publicly identified. Investigators also examined two USB flash drives found in the car. They contained family pictures, digital movies, and NASA-related materials. Investigators concluded that the information on the disk and USB drives did not have any direct relationship to the alleged kidnapping attempt.

Oefelein had provided Nowak with a cell phone to communicate with him. Phone records show that she called him at least twelve times and sent seven text messages the day after he returned from his Space Shuttle flight on December 22, 2006, that he did not retrieve until December 24, when they had a seven-minute conversation. During December and January, over 100 calls were made, although it is unclear who called whom. Under questioning by NASA and military investigators, Oefelein reportedly stated that he had ended their romantic relationship. He did, however, have lunch with her in his apartment at least once in January, they continued to train together for the bicycle race, and they went to the gym together.

On May 11, 2007, authorities released a surveillance video from Orlando International Airport terminal showing Nowak waiting for nearly an hour, standing near the baggage claim, then donning a trench coat and following Shipman after she retrieved her bags.

=== Developments ===
On February 6, 2007, Nowak pleaded not guilty to the charges of attempted murder and attempted kidnapping. On March 2, Florida prosecutors filed three formal charges against Nowak: attempted kidnapping with intent to inflict bodily harm or terrorize; burglary of a conveyance with a weapon; and battery. The prosecutors declined to file the attempted murder charge that had been recommended by Orlando police. She was ordered to wear an electronic monitoring ankle bracelet as a condition of her release. A pre-trial hearing was held on July 17, 2007, and further hearings were to be held on September 19, to argue defense motions to suppress some of the evidence obtained on the day of her arrest. On August 12, 2007, Nowak asked to have her GPS ankle bracelet removed, to which the judge agreed on August 30. On August 28, the trial judge unsealed a court document indicating that Nowak intended to pursue an insanity defense. According to documents submitted by her lawyer, Nowak was evaluated by two psychiatrists who diagnosed her with obsessive–compulsive personality disorder, Asperger syndrome, a single episode of major depressive disorder and a "brief psychotic disorder with marked stressors" at the time of the incident.

The trial judge suppressed Nowak's initial (pre-Miranda) statements to police, as well as all evidence found in her vehicle, on November 2, 2007, citing police misconduct in their initial search and questioning. The prosecution appealed that ruling on November 8. A hearing on that appeal occurred on October 21, 2008.

On December 5, 2008, the Florida Fifth District Court of Appeal held that her statements were taken in violation of her Miranda rights, but that the search of her car was still valid under the inevitable discovery exception to the search warrant requirement because the police would have inevitably found the evidence in the normal course of the investigation, even without her illegally obtained statements. The case was sent back for trial. A pre-trial status hearing was scheduled for June 22, 2009. On April 1, 2009, the judge ordered Nowak to undergo two psychiatric evaluations before June 12, 2009.

On May 15, 2009, it was reported that Nowak would not claim insanity if her case went to trial. Nowak's attorney withdrew a previous motion filed in 2007, which would have left open the opportunity to use an insanity defense in the case. On October 7, 2009, a judge in Orlando ruled in favor of allowing Nowak's attorneys to take a second deposition from Shipman to inquire whether Nowak actually pepper-sprayed Shipman. A medical report by paramedics raised some questions according to Nowak's attorneys as to the factual basis for it. If it was found not to have occurred, Nowak's attorneys wanted the criminal charges related to the assault and battery dropped before trial began. The trial was scheduled for December 7, 2009. On November 10, 2009, Nowak entered a guilty plea to felony burglary and misdemeanor battery as part of a plea deal. She was sentenced to a year's probation and the two days already served in jail, with no additional jail time. In March 2011, Nowak petitioned the court to seal the record of her criminal proceedings, citing harm to her family and their livelihood. The motion was granted.

== After NASA ==
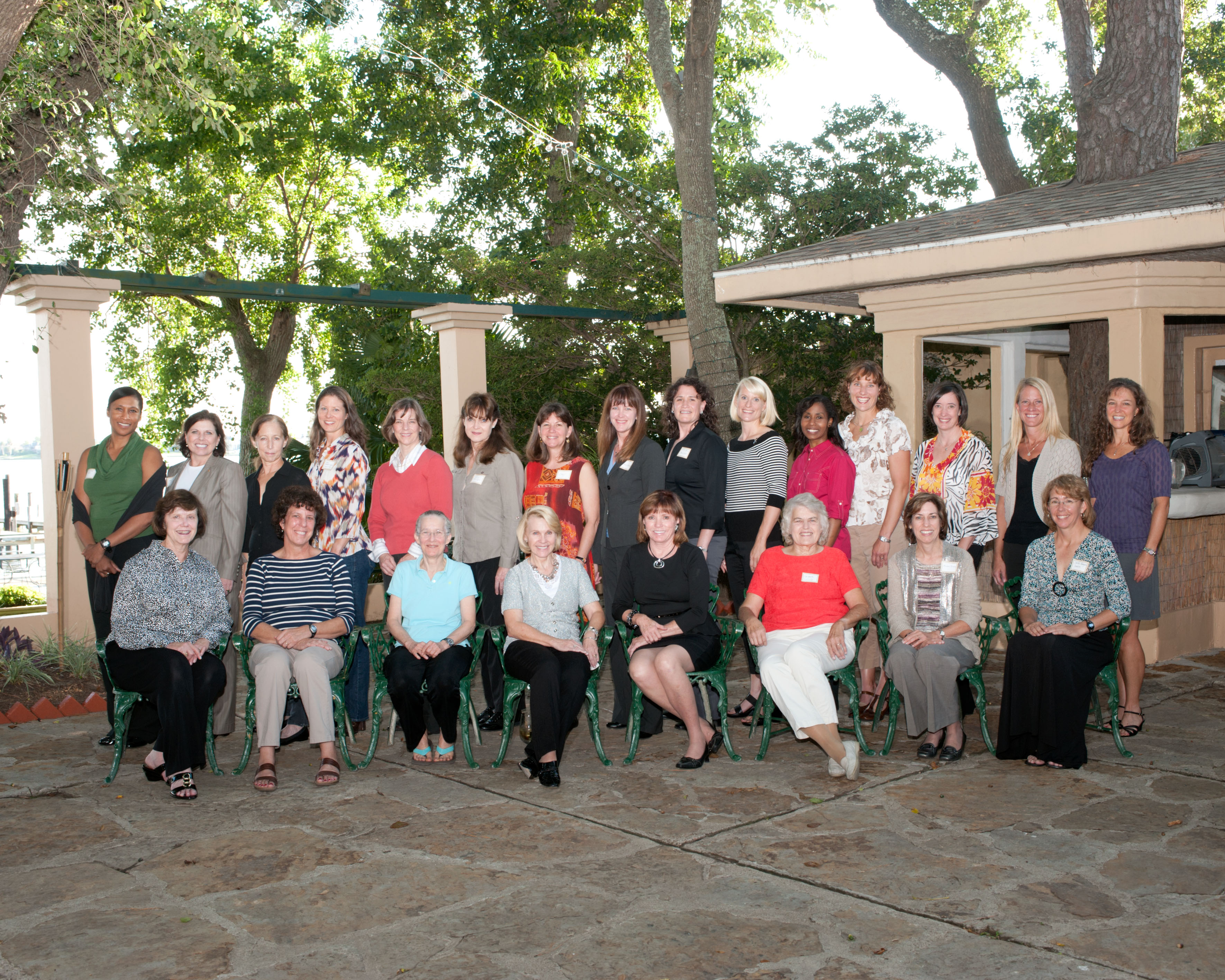
Nowak (standing, far right) with 21 other women astronauts and the first female Director of the Johnson Space Center (2012)

After the incident in Orlando, the Navy insisted on Nowak and Oefelein being returned to the Navy from NASA because they had violated the Navy's rules prohibiting adultery. Naval officials waited for Nowak's kidnapping case to be resolved before taking further action against her. She remained on active duty with the Navy and was subsequently ordered to work on the staff of the Chief of Naval Air Training (CNATRA) at Naval Air Station Corpus Christi, Texas. There, she was involved in the development of flight training curricula for broad use throughout the Navy. Nowak received the NASA Space Flight Medal on August 22, 2006, and on June 5, 2007. Nowak and her husband Richard divorced in June 2008, and she was given full custody of their three children.

A Naval Board of Inquiry consisting of Rear Admirals Mark S. Boensel, Eleanor V. Valentin and Timothy S. Matthews voted on August 19, 2010, to recommend Nowak be discharged from the Navy under other than honorable conditions and reduced in rank from captain to commander. The panel's recommendation had to be reviewed by the Naval Personnel Command, and ultimately it would be determined by the Secretary of the Navy. On July 28, 2011, Assistant Secretary of Navy Juan M. Garcia III confirmed the panel's sentence. Nowak's conduct, Garcia said in a statement, "fell well short" of what is expected of Navy officers and "demonstrated a complete disregard for the well-being of a fellow service member". She retired from the Navy with an other than honorable discharge and the rank of commander on September 1, 2011.

Astronaut Michael Coats, the director of the Johnson Space Center from 2005 to 2012, recalled that Nowak struggled after leaving the Navy, as the notoriety of her case kept potential employers from hiring her. In 2017, People magazine reported that Nowak was living quietly in Texas, where she was working in the private sector. Her attorney stated: "She's doing well."

== In popular culture ==
Many found Nowak's story fascinating, and it has been adapted for music, film, and television. "Rocket Man", a 2007 episode of Law & Order: Criminal Intent, was inspired in part by Nowak's story and featured a love triangle among astronauts. A 2008 Molly Lewis song, "Road Trip", recounts the details of early news reports about Nowak's trip from Houston to Orlando. The Ben Folds song "Cologne", from his 2008 album Way to Normal, also mentions the incident. The 2017 Austra music video for "I Love You More Than You Love Yourself" references the actions leading up to Nowak's final arrest, with bandleader Katie Stelmanis playing the role of Nowak. Nowak was also the subject of a play, Starcrosser's Cut, which opened in Los Angeles in June 2013. The 2019 film Lucy in the Sky, starring Natalie Portman, was loosely based on Nowak's story.
