= Mark S. Boensel =

United States Navy admiral

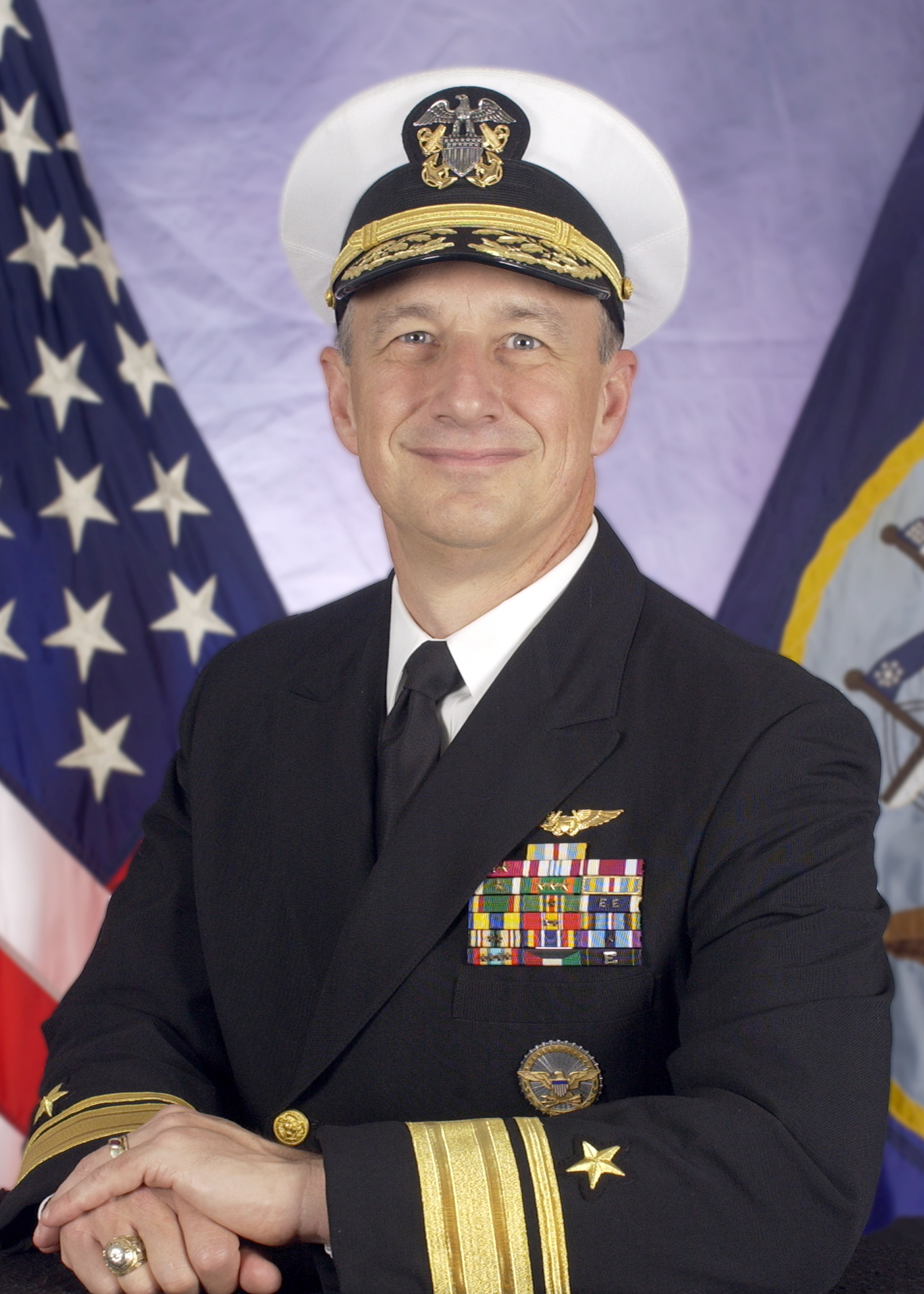
- Born: 26 December 1955 (age 70)
- Military career
- Allegiance: United States
- Branch: United States Navy
- Service years: 1978–2012
- Rank: Rear Admiral
- Commands: VS-29; Naval Air Station Jacksonville; Navy Region Southeast; Navy Region Mid-Atlantic
- Conflicts: Operation Desert Shield
- Awards: Navy Distinguished Service Medal; Defense Superior Service Medal; Legion of Merit (4); Defense Meritorious Service Medal; Meritorious Service Medal; Navy and Marine Corps Commendation Medal (2); Navy and Marine Corps Achievement Medal (4)

Mark Stephen Boensel (born 26 December 1955) is a former rear admiral in the United States Navy. A graduate of the United States Naval Academy in Annapolis, Maryland, with the class of 1978, he became a naval flight officer, and served on aircraft carriers, including operational deployment in Operation Desert Shield in 1990. He commanded Navy Region Southeast from December 2005 to October 2007, and Navy Region Mid-Atlantic from November 2007 until September 2011. He officially retired from the Navy on 1 January 2012 and since then has pursued a business career in Jacksonville, Florida.

== Navy career ==
Mark Stephen Boensel was born on 26 December 1955. He graduated from the United States Naval Academy in Annapolis, Maryland, with the class of 1978. He completed flight training and qualified as a naval flight officer in 1979. He trained on the Lockheed S-3 Viking with Sea Control Squadron 41 (VS-41), then joined Sea Control Squadron 29 (VS-29) for a deployment to the Western Pacific and Indian Ocean aboard the aircraft carrier USS Kitty Hawk, and a round-the-world cruise on the aircraft carrier USS Carl Vinson. He then rejoined VS-41 as a flight instructor, and served with Carrier Air Wing Ten as its Submarine Warfare Officer and Administrative Officer.

In 1989, Boensel graduated from the U.S. Naval War College, and joined Sea Control Squadron 37, where he served as its Training Officer, Operations Officer, and Maintenance Officer. He deployed with it to the Indian Ocean in 1990 on the aircraft carrier USS Independence as part of Operation Desert Shield. After this deployment he went to Washington, D.C. as the Special Assistant for Aviation to the Assistant Secretary of the Navy (Installations and Environment). He returned to VS-37 in 1994 as its Executive Officer, and deployed with it to the Western Pacific on the Kitty Hawk. VS-37 was disestablished in 1995, and he assumed command of VS-29 in July 1995, which deployed to the Persian Gulf on the aircraft carrier USS Abraham Lincoln.

Sea duty normally alternates with shore duty, so Boensel returned to Washington, D.C., as a Military Assistant in the Office of the Secretary of Defense, and then, in 1997, in the Office of the Under Secretary of Defense for Policy. He was an Executive Assistant on the staff of the Commander, Naval Air Force, Pacific from June 1999 to January 2001. He assumed command of Naval Air Station Jacksonville in April 2001, and was promoted to the rank of rear admiral (lower half) in March 2004. He returned to Washington, D.C., in July 2004 as the Director of the Environmental Readiness Division (N45) in the Office of the Chief of Naval Operations, and was promoted to rear admiral (upper half) in May 2007. He commanded Navy Region Southeast from December 2005 to October 2007, and Navy Region Mid-Atlantic from November 2007 until September 2011. In August 2010, he was one of three admirals on the administrative panel that reviewed the case of astronaut Lisa Nowak, and recommended her separation from the Navy with an other than honorable discharge and reduction in rank.

In addition to his Bachelor of Science degree from Annapolis, Boensel earned three master's degrees: in Business Administration, Internal Relations and National Security and Strategic Studies. During his naval career, he received many awards, including the Navy Distinguished Service Medal, the Defense Superior Service Medal, the Legion of Merit four times, the Defense Meritorious Service Medal, the Meritorious Service Medal, the Navy and Marine Corps Commendation Medal twice, and the Navy and Marine Corps Achievement Medal four times. He had flown over 3,200 flight hours, made more than 600 carrier arrested landings.

== Business career ==
Boensel officially retired from the Navy on 1 January 2012, and moved to Jacksonville, Florida. He founded his own consulting firm, Boesel Consulting Services, and served for two terms on the Jacksonville Chamber of Commerce Board of Directors. He also was an independent director on the Board of Directors of Route1, Inc., a firm that provided cyber-security solutions for mobile devices. In 2016, he joined the advisory board of FlingGolf.
