= Scott Kelly (astronaut) =

American engineer, astronaut, and naval aviator (born 1964)

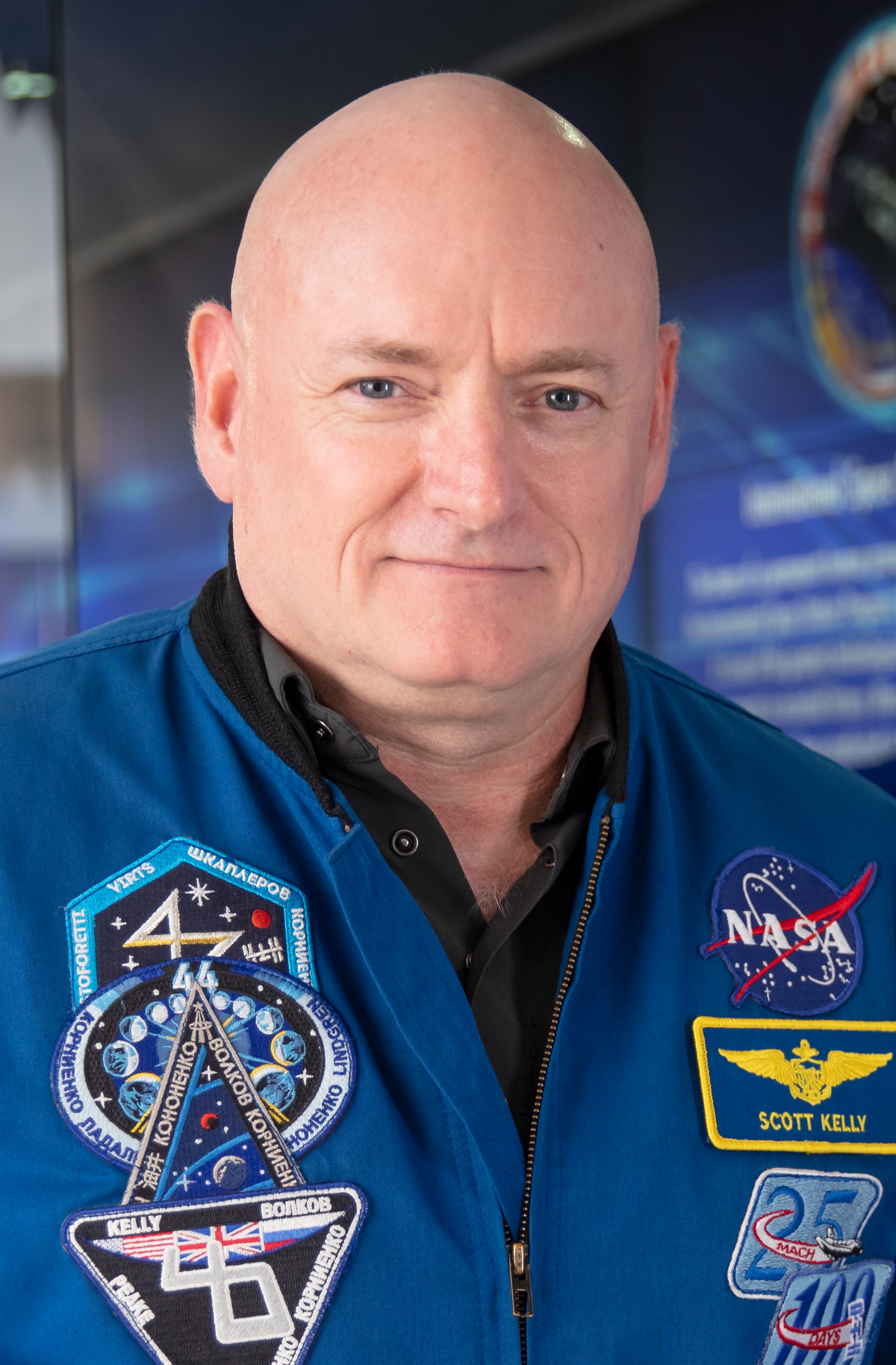
- Kelly at the Johnson Space Center in 2019
- Born: Scott Joseph Kelly; February 21, 1964 (age 62); Orange, New Jersey, U.S.
- Education: University of Maryland, Baltimore County; State University of New York Maritime College (BEng); University of Tennessee, Knoxville (MS)
- Spouses: Leslie Yandell (m. 1992; div. 2009) Amiko Kauderer (m. 2018)
- Children: 2
- Relatives: Mark Kelly (identical twin brother); Gabby Giffords (sister-in-law)
- Space career
- Rank: Captain, USN
- Time in space: 520d, 10h, 33m, 36s
- Selection: NASA Group 16 (1996)
- Total EVAs: 3
- Total EVA time: 18h 20m
- Mission: STS-103; STS-118; Soyuz TMA-01M (Expedition 25/26); Soyuz TMA-16M/Soyuz TMA-18M (Expedition 43/44/45/46, ISS year-long mission)
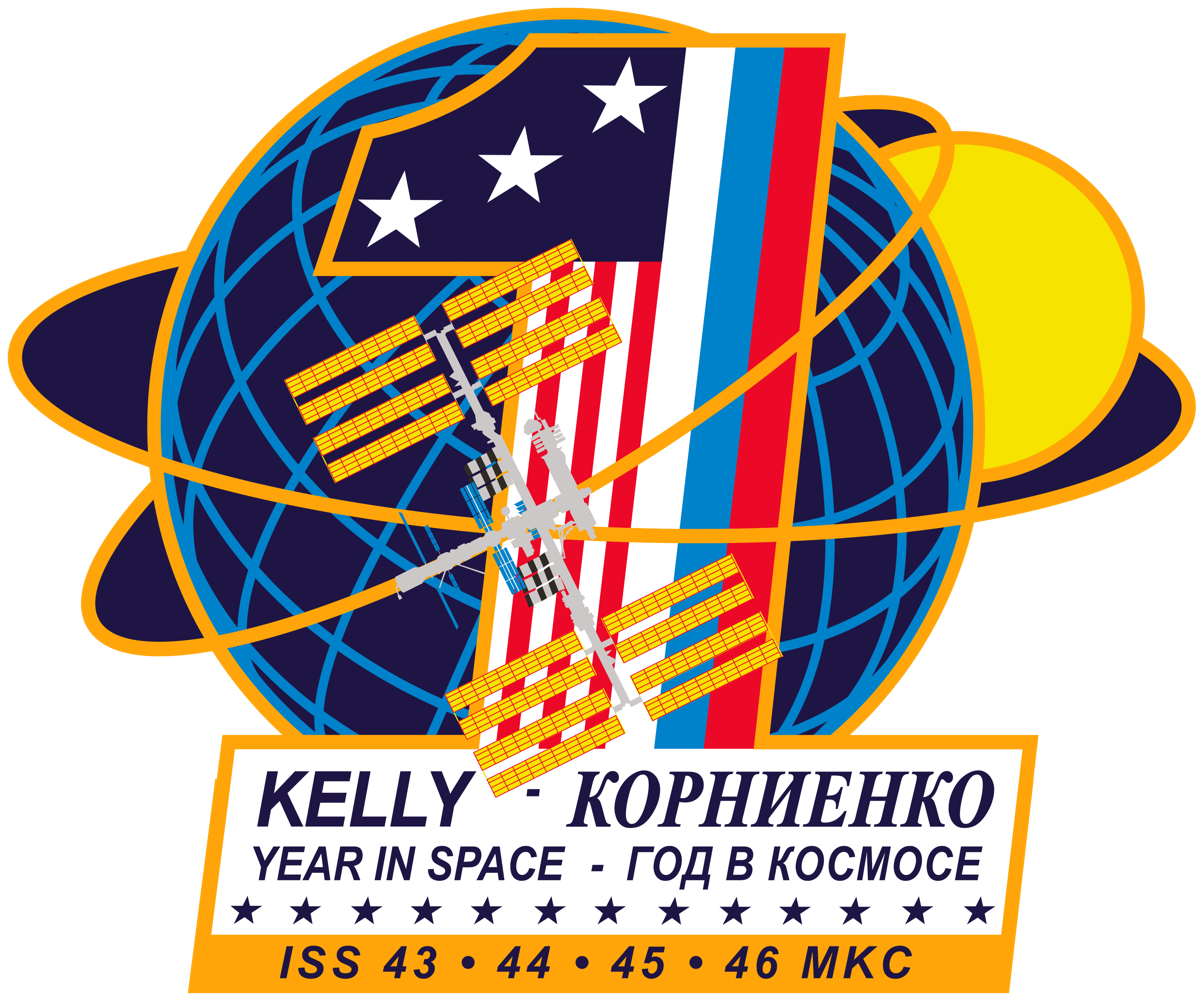
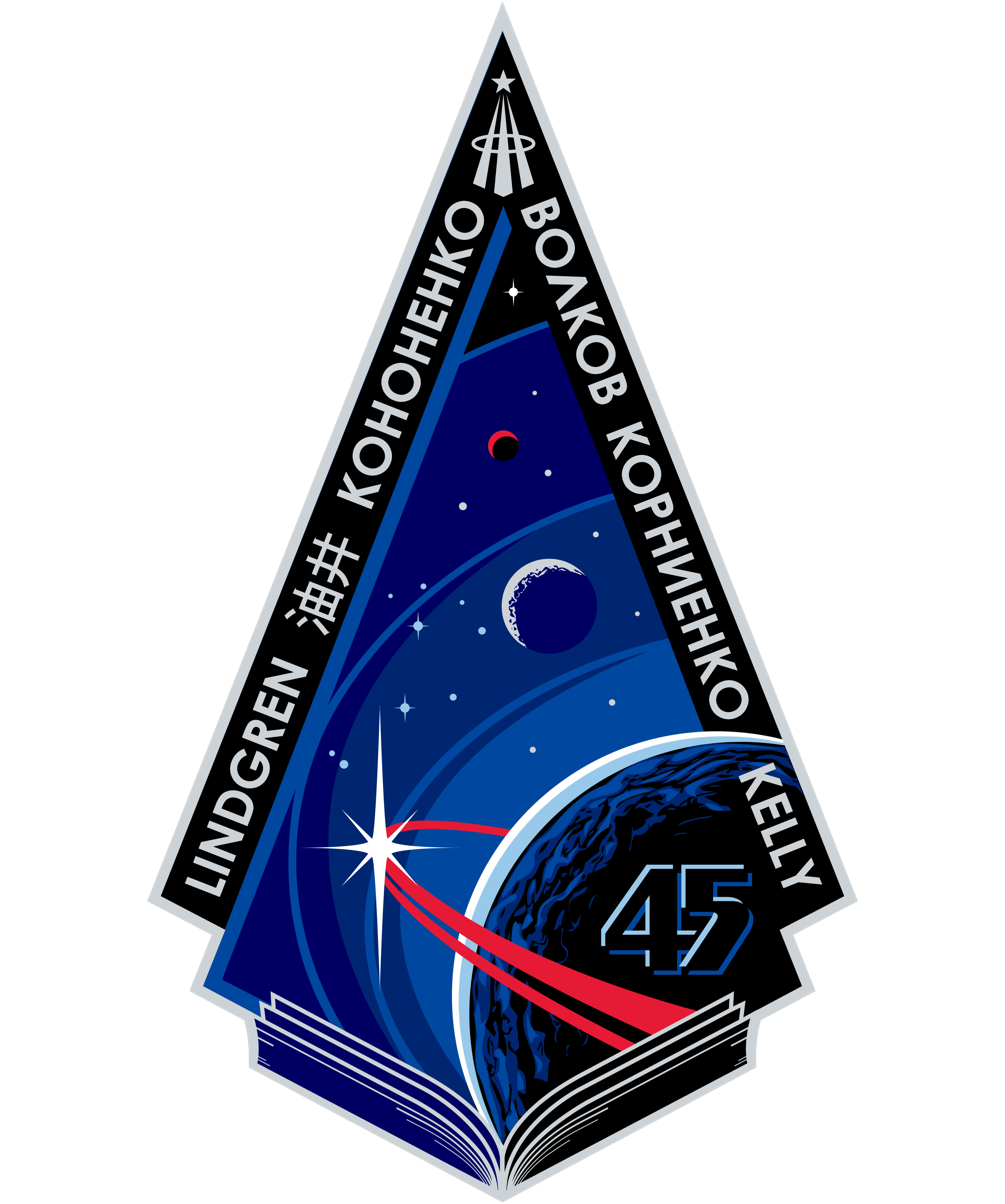
- Mission insignia
- Retired: April 1, 2016

Scott Joseph Kelly (born February 21, 1964) is an American engineer, retired astronaut, and naval aviator. A veteran of four space flights, Kelly commanded the International Space Station (ISS) on Expeditions 26, 45, and 46.

Kelly's first spaceflight was as pilot of Space Shuttle Discovery during STS-103 in December 1999. This was the third servicing mission to the Hubble Space Telescope, and lasted for just under eight days. Kelly's second spaceflight was as mission commander of STS-118, a 12-day Space Shuttle mission to the ISS in August 2007. Kelly's third spaceflight was as a crewmember on Expedition 25/26 on the ISS. He arrived at the ISS aboard Soyuz TMA-01M on October 9, 2010, and served as a flight engineer until he took over command of the station on November 25, 2010, at the start of Expedition 26. Expedition 26 ended on March 16, 2011, with the departure of Soyuz TMA-01M.

In November 2012, Kelly and Russian cosmonaut Mikhail Kornienko were selected for a year-long mission to the ISS. Their year in space began with the launch of Soyuz TMA-16M on March 27, 2015, and they remained on the station for Expeditions 43, 44, 45, and 46. The mission ended on March 1, 2016, with the departure of Soyuz TMA-18M from the station.

Kelly retired from NASA on April 1, 2016. His identical twin brother, Mark Kelly, is also a retired astronaut, and the senior U.S. senator from Arizona.

== Early life and education ==
Scott Kelly was born, along with his identical twin brother Mark, on February 21, 1964, in Orange, New Jersey, to Patricia (McAvoy) and Richard Kelly. Kelly's family lived in West Orange, where his parents worked as police officers. Kelly is of Irish descent. Kelly and his brother graduated from West Orange Mountain High School (New Jersey) in 1982. While in high school, Kelly worked as an emergency medical technician in Orange and Jersey City, New Jersey.

After graduating from high school, Kelly enrolled at the University of Maryland, Baltimore County. During his first year, Kelly read The Right Stuff by Tom Wolfe, and was inspired to pursue a career in naval aviation. After his first year, Kelly transferred to State University of New York Maritime College, where he received a Naval Reserve Officers Training Corps (Navy ROTC) scholarship. During the summer after his first year, Kelly sailed aboard SUNY Maritime's training ship, Empire State V, and stopped in Mallorca, Hamburg, and London. After his second year, Kelly sailed again on Empire State V. He served as the student battalion commander for his school's Navy ROTC detachment, and graduated with a Bachelor of Engineering degree in electrical engineering in 1987. Kelly later earned a Master of Science degree in aviations systems from the University of Tennessee.

== Naval career ==
After graduation, Kelly was commissioned as an ensign in the United States Navy. He completed his initial flight school at NAS Pensacola, where he flew the T-34 Mentor propeller driven trainer plane, after which he was selected to fly jets. In 1988, he moved to Beeville, Texas, for jet training Naval Air Station Chase Field, where he trained on the T-2 Buckeye and the A-4 Skyhawk. He graduated as a naval aviator in 1989, and was assigned to fly the F-14 Tomcat. He reported to VF-101 at Naval Air Station Oceana, Virginia, for initial F-14 training. Upon completion of this training in September 1990, he was assigned to VF-143, and deployed to the North Atlantic and Persian Gulf aboard the aircraft carrier USS Dwight D. Eisenhower.

In January 1993, Kelly was selected to attend the U.S. Naval Test Pilot School at Naval Air Station Patuxent River, Maryland. His classmates included his brother, Mark, and other future astronauts Alvin Drew, Lisa Nowak, and Stephen Frick. He graduated in June 1994 and was assigned to the Strike Aircraft Test Directorate at Patuxent River. One of his initial assignments was to investigate the F-14 crash that killed Kara Hultgreen. His conclusion was that a digital flight control system could have saved Hultgreen's life. This resulted in the acceleration of the development of such a system, and Kelly was the first pilot to fly the F-14 with it installed.

After attaining the rank of captain in the U.S. Navy, Kelly retired from active duty on June 19, 2012, after 25 years of naval service. He flew over 8,000 hours in more than 40 aircraft and accomplished over 250 carrier landings throughout his naval career.

== NASA career ==
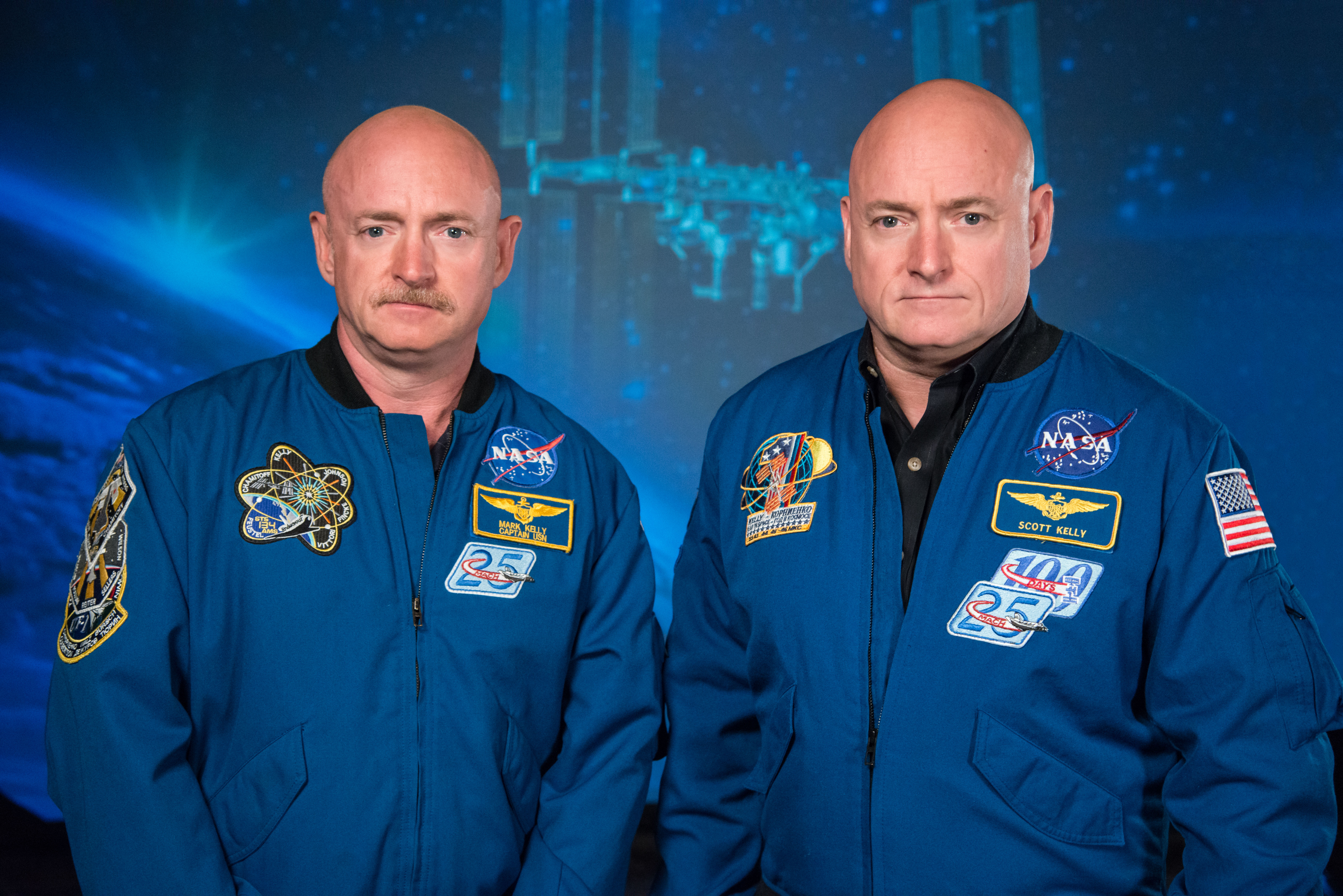
Scott Kelly (r) with his twin brother Mark in 2015 ahead of the Year in Space mission.

In 1995, Kelly and his brother applied to NASA to become astronauts. He and Mark were selected to become astronaut candidates in April 1996; the first relatives to be selected in NASA history. In July 1996, Kelly moved to Houston, and began training in Astronaut Group 16 at the Johnson Space Center. On completion of training, he was assigned to work on the caution and warning system on board the International Space Station.

After Kelly's first flight on STS-103, he served as NASA's director of operations in Star City, Russia. He served as back-up crew member to Peggy Whitson for ISS Expedition 5, and to Tracy Caldwell Dyson on Expedition 23/24. After the Space Shuttle Columbia disaster, Kelly coordinated airplane and helicopter searches for debris. He also served as the Astronaut Office Space Station Branch Chief.

In September 2002, Kelly served as the commander of the NEEMO 4 mission aboard the Aquarius underwater laboratory, 4 mi offshore from Key Largo. The NEEMO 4 crew spent five days saturation diving from Aquarius as a space analog for working and training under extreme environmental conditions. The mission was delayed due to Hurricane Isidore, reducing the underwater duration to five days. In April 2005, Kelly was a crew member on the three-day NEEMO 8 mission. During the NEEMO 8 mission, the crew practiced construction while conducting an extravehicular activity (EVA) using a remotely operated underwater vehicle, and training with the Exploration Planning Operations Center at the Johnson Space Center.

=== STS-103 ===
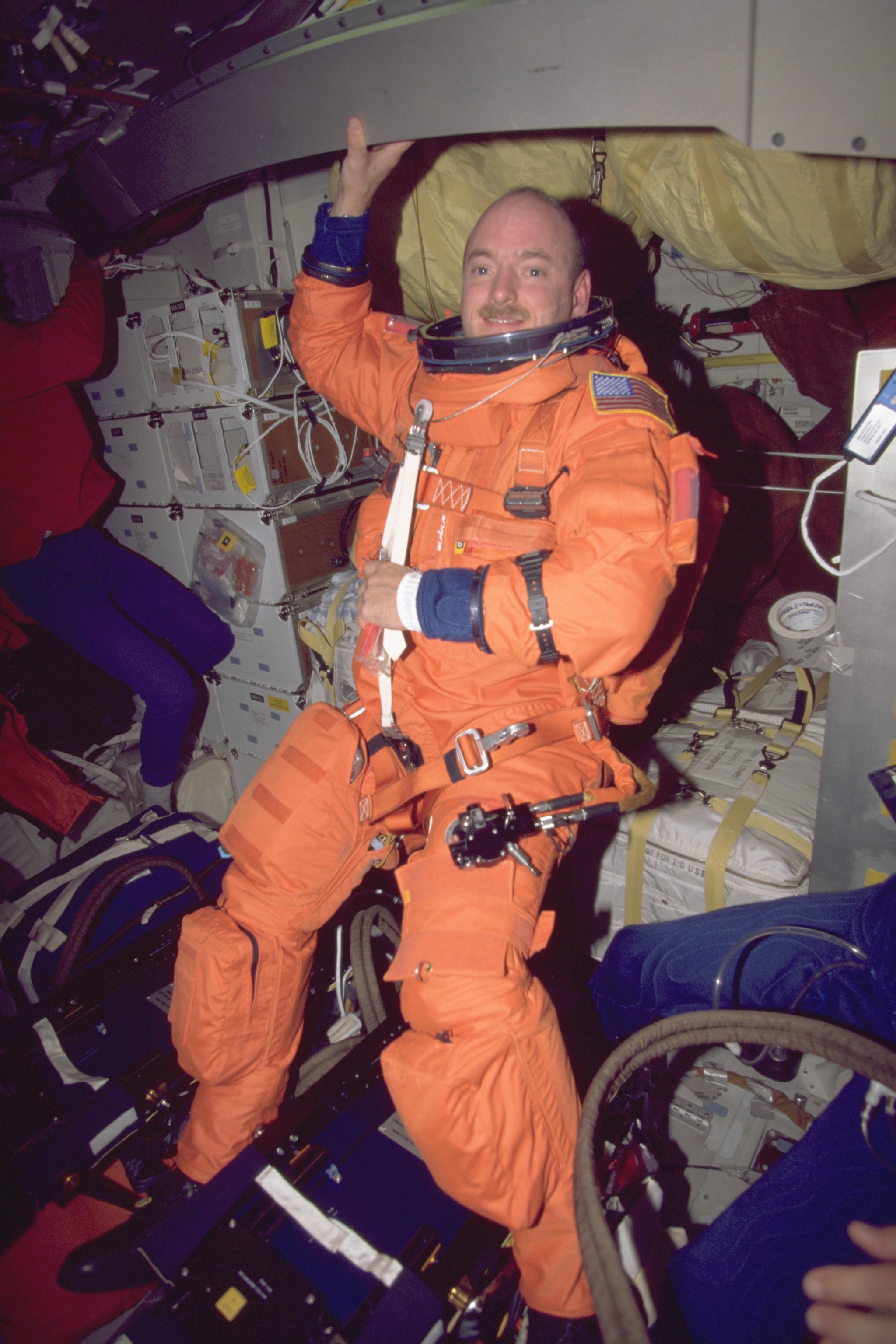
Kelly on STS-103 in a partial-pressure suit for reentry and landing (1999)

In March 1999, Kelly was assigned to STS-103 as a pilot aboard Discovery, under command of Curt Brown, on a mission to install new instruments and upgraded systems on the Hubble Space Telescope (HST). Discovery launched on December 19, 1999, and rendezvoused with the HST after 40 orbits. The STS-103 mission specialists conducted three EVAs to replace gyroscopes and a transmitter, and to install a new computer guidance sensor and recorder. On December 25, 1999, the crew celebrated the only Christmas holiday of the Space Shuttle in orbit with a reading by Curt Brown. After 119 orbits, Discovery landed at the Kennedy Space Center on December 27, 1999.

=== STS-118 ===
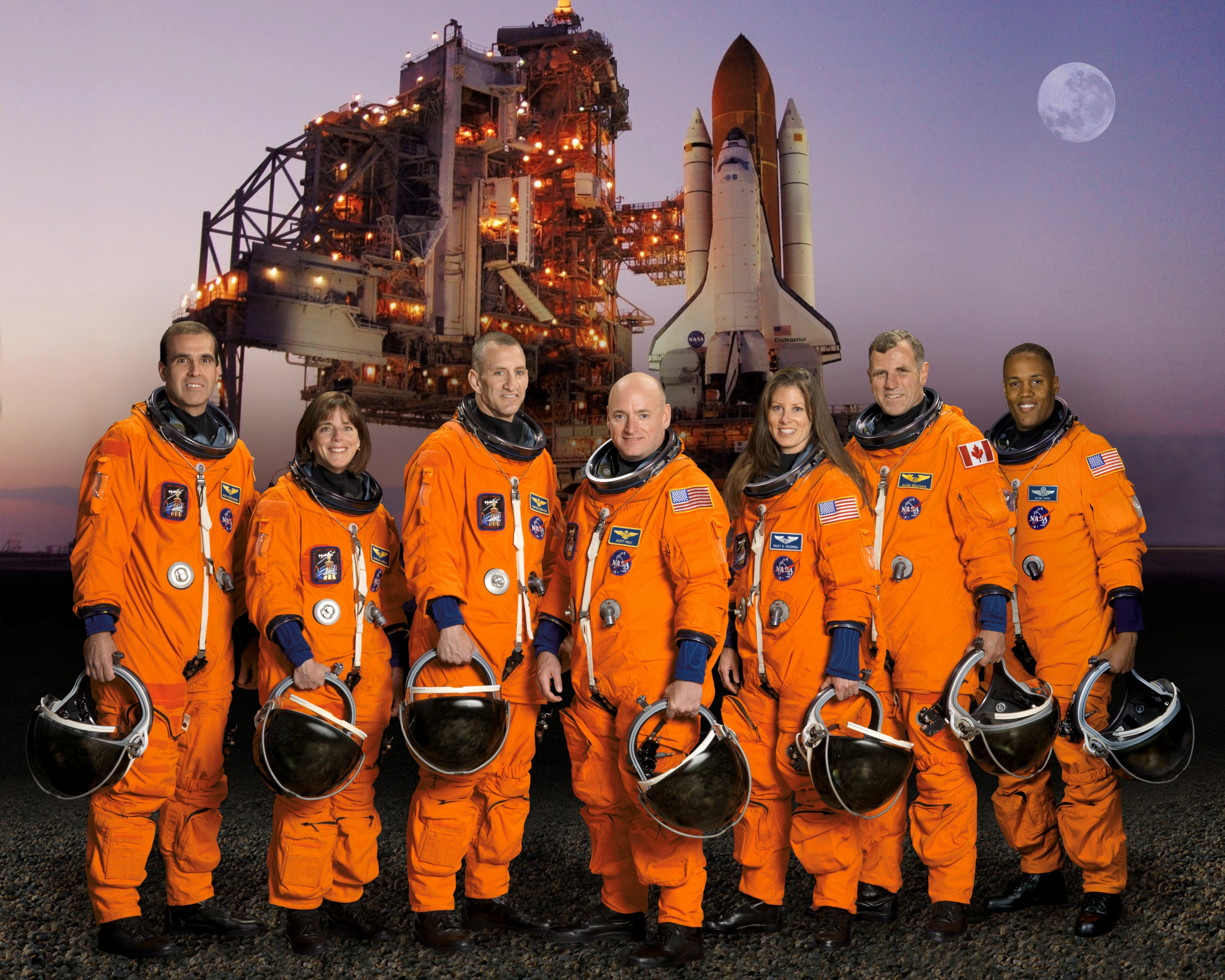
The crew of STS-118 (2007)

After completing his assignment as a back-up member for ISS Expedition 5 in 2002, Kelly was assigned as commander of STS-118 aboard Endeavour. After the Space Shuttle Columbia disaster, STS-118 was delayed until August 2007. STS-118 launched on August 8, 2007. During the launch, the orbiter was struck by nine pieces of foam from the external tank just as Columbia had been on its final, fatal mission. The underside of Endeavour was examined by cameras on the robotic arm and the ISS, and was assessed to not be dangerously damaged. The Shuttle successfully docked with the ISS on August 10. Endeavour's crew successfully added a truss segment, an external spare-parts platform, and a control moment gyroscope to the ISS. The mission was extended to 14 days while testing a new system that enabled docked shuttles to draw electrical power from the station. During the mission, four EVAs to install the new equipment were completed. The mission was ended a day early because of the approach of Hurricane Dean towards Houston. STS-118 completed 201 orbits, and landed on August 21, 2007, at the Kennedy Space Center, after 12 days, 17 hours, 55 minutes, and 34 seconds.

=== Expedition 25/26 ===
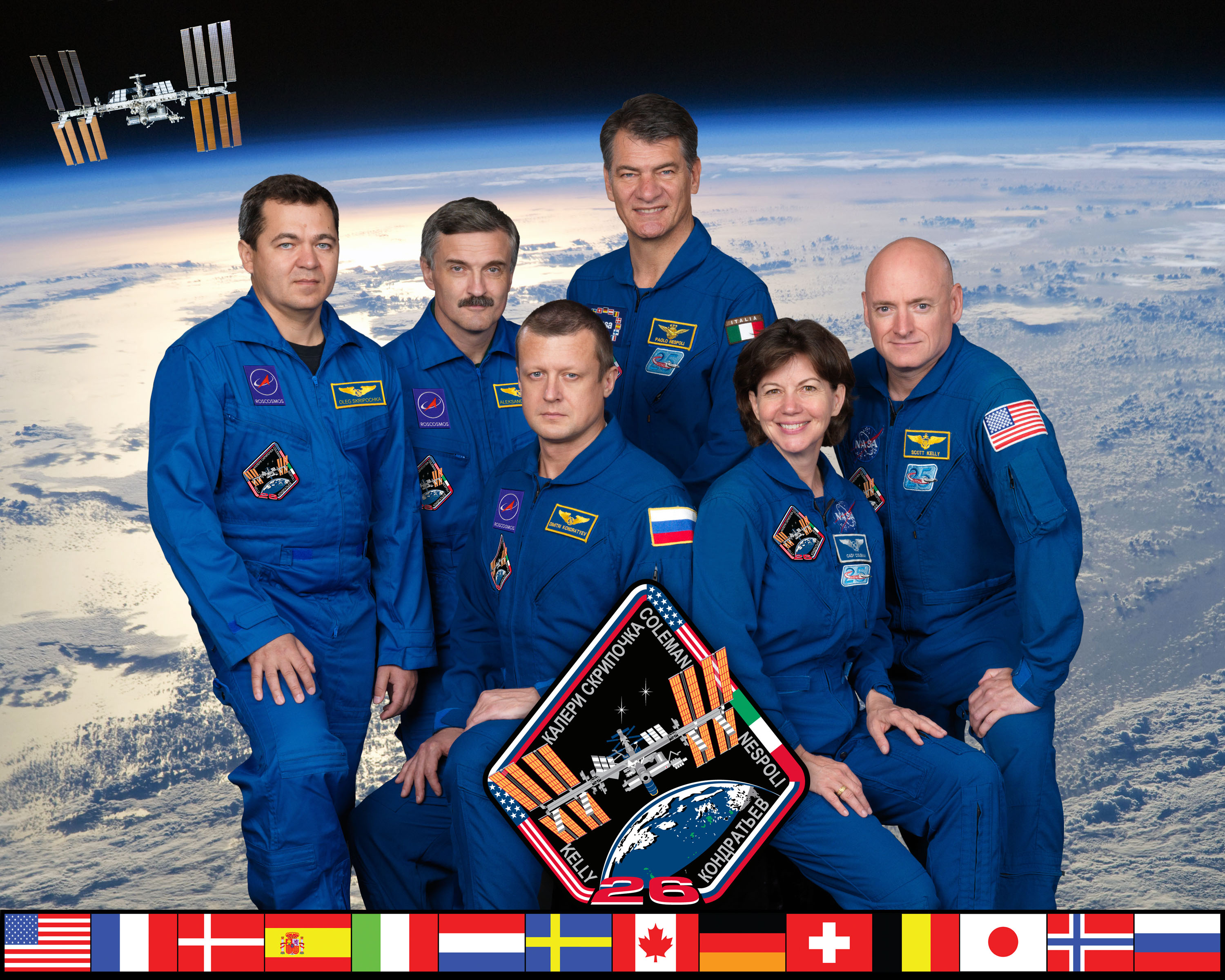
The Expedition 26 crew (2010)

In late 2007, Kelly was assigned to Expeditions 25 and 26. Kelly lifted off aboard Soyuz TMA-01M from the Baikonur Cosmodrome in Kazakhstan at 7:10 pm EDT on October 7, 2010, along with cosmonauts Aleksandr Kaleri and Oleg Skripochka. TMA-01M was the first launch of an updated model of the Soyuz spacecraft, and featured improved guidance, environmental control, and flight-control systems. Kelly, Kaleri, and Skripochka arrived at the ISS on October 9, 2010, and joined commander Douglas H. Wheelock and flight engineers Shannon Walker and Fyodor Yurchikhin on Expedition 25.

During Kelly's time aboard the ISS, the crew supported about 115 scientific experiments, including an improved water-recycling machine, the Boiler Experiment Facility to test heat transfer in microgravity, and a Japanese experiment to research vegetable growth in microgravity. During Expedition 25, cosmonauts Yurchikhin and Skripochka conducted an EVA to install a workstation on the Zvezda module, install handrails, and removed three Russian experiments. The crew of Expedition 24/25 returned to Earth on November 25, 2010, aboard Soyuz TMA-19; Wheelock transferred command of the station to Kelly.

On December 17, 2010, Soyuz TMA-20 arrived at the station with the crew of Expedition 26/27 cosmonaut Dmitri Kondratyev, NASA astronaut Catherine Coleman, and ESA astronaut Paolo Nespoli. The crew of STS-133 aboard Discovery arrived at the station February 26, 2011. The crew of STS-133 performed two EVAs to replace a pump and install the Permanent Multipurpose Module. Discovery undocked from the ISS on March 7, 2011, and landed for the final time two days later.

On January 8, 2011, while Kelly was on the ISS, Kelly's sister-in-law Congresswoman Gabby Giffords was shot in Tucson. Soyuz TMA-01M landed in Kazakhstan on March 16, 2011, and Kelly traveled to TIRR Memorial Hermann in Houston to see Giffords and Mark. Mark was the commander of STS-134, the final flight of Endeavour, and launched on May 16, 2011, with Giffords in attendance. STS-134 had originally been scheduled to launch in February 2011, which would have made the Kelly brothers the first twins to fly together in space.

=== Expedition 43/44/45/46 ===
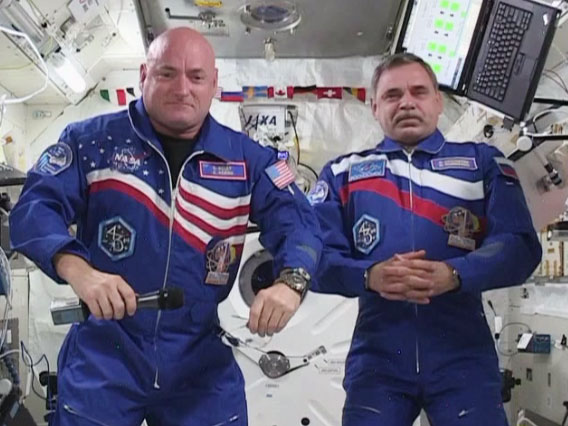
Kelly and Korniyenko aboard the ISS (2015)

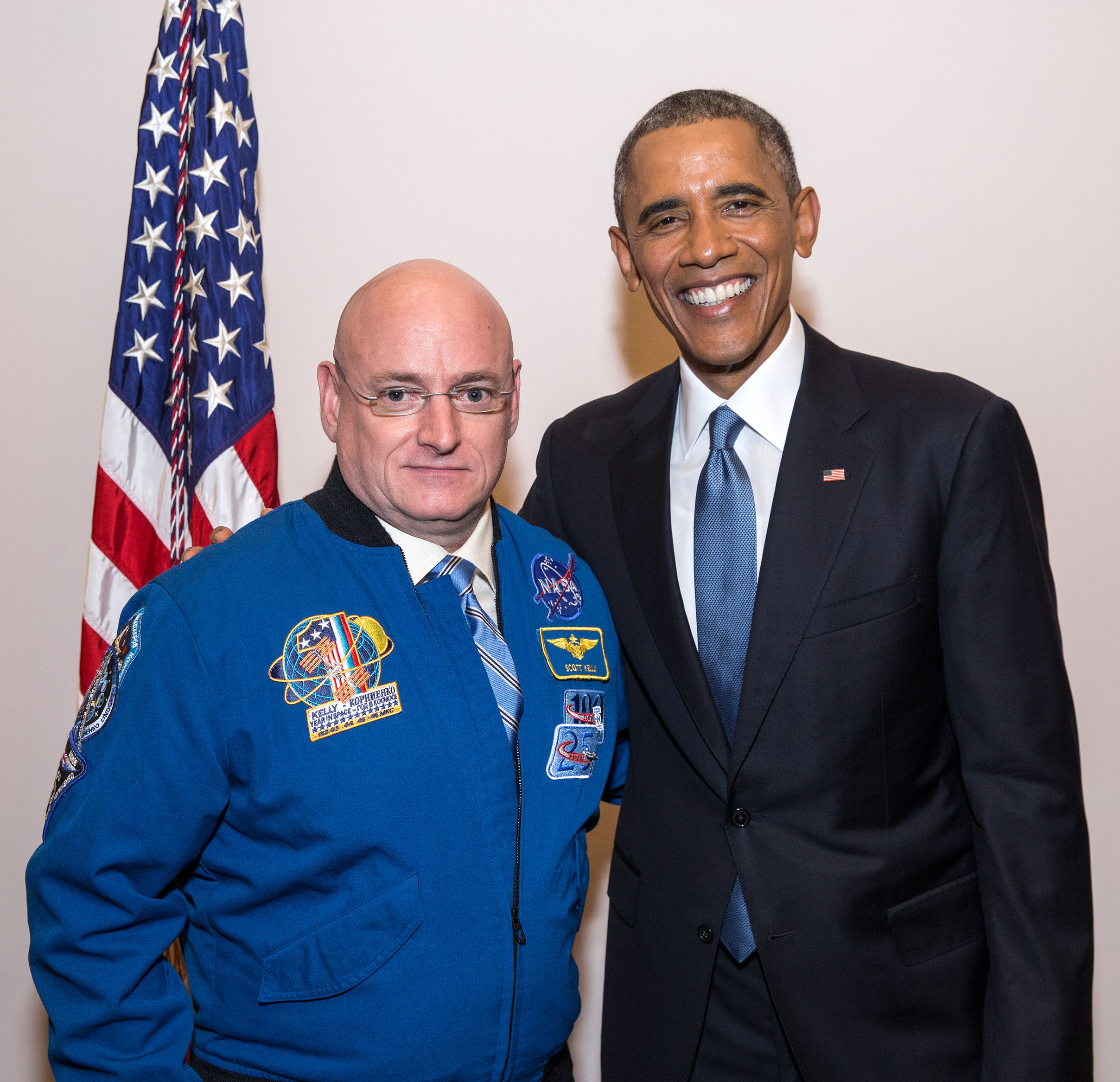
Kelly with President Barack Obama in January 2015

NASA began planning for a year-long mission aboard the ISS following a Russian announcement for a similar mission. The primary goal of the year-long expedition aboard the orbiting laboratory was to better understand the effects of spaceflight on the human body. In November 2012, Kelly was selected for a one-year mission to the ISS, but was medically disqualified the following day due to his vision worsening in microgravity. Kelly appealed to NASA, and was reselected for the mission along with cosmonaut Mikhail Kornienko.

Kelly, Kornienko, and Gennady Padalka launched aboard Soyuz TMA-16M spacecraft from the Baikonur Cosmodrome in Kazakhstan at 3:42 pm EDT on March 27, 2015. TMA-16M docked with the ISS at 9:36 pm EDT, and the crew joined the Expedition 43 crew of commander Terry Virts and flight engineers Anton Shkaplerov and Samantha Cristoforetti. Once aboard, the crew performed scientific experiments, including evaluations of the fluid shifts in their bodies to determine their effects on eyesight, and repeated collections of blood and urine for chemical analysis. During Expedition 43, the ISS received supplies from the SpaceX Dragon CRS-6 mission, but lost their resupply due to the failure of the Russian Progress 59 spacecraft. Expedition 44 began on June 11, 2015, when Virts transferred command of the ISS to Padalka, and Soyuz TMA-15M landed in Kazakhstan at 9:44 am EDT.

Soyuz TMA-17M docked with the ISS on July 22, 2015, bringing NASA astronaut Kjell Lindgren, Russian cosmonaut Oleg Kononenko, and JAXA astronaut Kimiya Yui to join Expedition 44. During Expedition 44, the ISS was resupplied by the JAXA HTV-5 and the Russian Progress 60 vehicles; the crew experienced another loss of a resupply mission with the SpaceX CRS-7 failure. On August 28, 2016, the crew of Soyuz TMA-16M undocked and subsequently docked the spacecraft to a different port to prepare for the arrival of Soyuz TMA-18M. Soyuz TMA-18M docked with the ISS on September 4, 2015, bringing Russian cosmonaut Sergey Volkov, ESA astronaut Andreas Mogensen, and Kazakh cosmonaut Aidyn Aimbetov to the station. One of Soyuz TMA-18M's missions was to deliver a new Soyuz to the station for the return of Kelly, Korniyenko, and Volkov in March 2016; they could not return on Soyuz TMA-16M due to the 200-day orbital lifespan of a Soyuz. Padalka, Mogensen, and Aimbetov departed from the ISS on September 11, 2015, and landed in Kazakhstan in Soyuz TMA-16M.

Expedition 45 began on September 11, 2015, when Padalka transferred command of the station to Kelly. During the expedition, the ISS crew was resupplied by the Progress 61 and the Cygnus CRS OA-4 missions. On October 28, 2015, Kelly and Lindgren performed an EVA to service the Canada Arm 2, the Alpha Magnetic Spectrometer, and to install cables for the International Docking Adapter for the Boeing CST-100 Starliner and SpaceX Crew Dragon spacecraft. Kelly and Lindgren performed a second EVA on November 6, 2015, to service the ammonia cooling system on the P6 truss. Expedition 46 began on December 11, 2015, with the departure of Soyuz TMA-17M, carrying Lindgren, Kononenko, and Yui.

On December 15, 2015, NASA astronaut Timothy Kopra, ESA astronaut Timothy Peake, and Russian cosmonaut Yuri Malenchenko joined Expedition 46 as flight engineers after Soyuz TMA-19M docked with the ISS. On December 21, 2015, Kelly and Kopra performed an unscheduled EVA to release the brake handles on the Mobile Transporter rail car for the Canada Arm 2, which had unexpectedly stopped when it was remotely commanded by the flight controllers. After the successful repair of the Mobile Transporter, the ISS crew was resupplied on December 23, 2015, by the Progress 62 spacecraft. On January 15, 2016, Kopra and Peake performed another EVA and successfully replaced a voltage regulator, but were forced to return early after water began forming inside of Kopra's helmet. On January 8, 2016, Kelly appeared in the thank-you note segment of The Tonight Show Starring Jimmy Fallon, with the first ever thank-you note from space. Russian cosmonauts Malenchenko and Volkov conducted an EVA on February 3, 2016, to retrieve experiments and photograph the exterior portions of the Russian segment of the station. On March 1, 2016, Kelly transferred command of the ISS to Kopra, and returned to Earth alongside Korniyenko and Volkov aboard Soyuz TMA-18M. The spacecraft landed in Kazakhstan, and Kelly returned to Houston the following day.

In addition to the biological tests conducted on all astronauts on the station, Kelly also participated in comparative study on the effects of spaceflight with his identical twin Mark as the ground control subject. Kelly's cognitive, and genetic traits were measured before and after the flight. Within several months after returning to Earth, Kelly had adapted to living in gravity. Genetic tests revealed changes in Kelly's gene expression, and an increase in the length of his telomeres relative to before his flight.

== Post-NASA career ==
On March 12, 2016, Kelly announced his retirement from NASA, effective April 1, 2016. On November 20, 2016, Kelly was appointed United Nations Champion for Space by the United Nations Office for Outer Space Affairs (UNOOSA), to assist in raising awareness of UNOOSA outreach and activities. In November 2017, a memoir by Kelly was released, called Endurance: A Year in Space, a Lifetime of Discovery. On June 19, 2018, Kelly spoke at the UNISPACE50+ conference in Vienna, expressing his views on the possibilities of human potential:

"After spending a year in space, I was absolutely inspired that if we can dream it, we can do it...and most importantly, if we work as a team, because teamwork makes the dream work. The sky is not the limit."

Kelly voiced himself in a cameo appearance in the 2024 Disney Channel original film Big City Greens the Movie: Spacecation.

== Personal life ==
On April 25, 1992, Kelly married for the first time, to Leslie (née Yandell), whom he had met while stationed in Virginia Beach. Together, they have two children. Kelly and Leslie divorced in 2010. In July 2018, Kelly married Amiko Kauderer, a public affairs officer for NASA. His sister-in-law is Gabby Giffords, a former congresswoman from Arizona.

In 2007, Kelly was successfully treated for prostate cancer. After Kelly received his diagnosis, his brother Mark was also diagnosed and successfully treated.

== Charity ==
On October 27, 2022, Kelly became an ambassador for the UNITED24 project. In the project, Kelly will help the "Medical Aid" department to collect funds for C-class ambulances. Doctors need several hundred such vehicles, because many ambulances were destroyed during the Russian-Ukrainian war.

== Awards and honors ==
Kelly has received these awards and decorations:

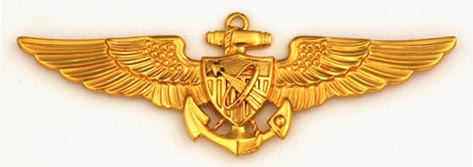
United States Naval Astronaut Badge

Ribbon	Description	Notes
	Defense Superior Service Medal	with Oak Leaf Cluster
	Legion of Merit	
	Distinguished Flying Cross	
	Navy and Marine Corps Commendation Medal	
	Navy Achievement Medal	
	Navy Unit Commendation	
	NASA Distinguished Service Medal	
	NASA Exceptional Service Medal	
	NASA Outstanding Leadership Medal	
	NASA Space Flight Medal	Three awards
	National Defense Service Medal	Two awards
	Southwest Asia Service Medal	
	Navy Sea Service Deployment Ribbon	
	Kuwait Liberation Medal (Saudi Arabia)	
	Kuwait Liberation Medal (Kuwait)	
	Medal "For Merit in Space Exploration"	Russian Federation

Kelly received an honorary Korolev Diploma from the Federation Aeronautique Internationale (1999) and an Honorary Doctorate of Science degree from the State University of New York (2008). Kelly was featured on the cover of Time on December 29, 2014. In 2015, Kelly was listed as one of the Time 100 Most Influential People .

Kelly is an associate fellow of the Society of Experimental Test Pilots and a member of the Association of Space Explorers.

On March 9, 2022, during 2022 Russian invasion of Ukraine, Kelly tweeted he will return his Medal "For Merit in Space Exploration" by mailing it to Russian embassy in Washington, telling former Russian president Dmitry Medvedev to give it to "a Russian mother whose son has died in this unjust war" instead. Kelly and Lt. General Mark Hertling, United States Army (retired), tweeted instructions for Russian soldiers to sabotage their T-72 main battle tanks.

On October 27, 2022, Kelly become the ambassador of the United24 (@u24_gov_ua) fundraising platform and will develop the "Medical aid" direction. His first project will be fundraising for Type C ambulance vehicles.

== Bibliography ==
- Kelly, Scott (2017). Endurance: A Year in Space, a Lifetime of Discovery. With Margaret Lazarus Dean. New York: Alfred A. Knopf. ISBN 978-1-5247-3159-5.
- Kelly, Scott (2017). My Journey to the Stars. With Emily Easton; illustrated by André Ceolin. New York: Crown Books for Young Readers. ISBN 978-1-5247-6377-0.
- Kelly, Scott (2018). Endurance, Young Readers Edition: My Year in Space and How I Got There. With Margaret Lazarus Dean; adapted for young readers by Emily Easton. New York: Crown Books for Young Readers. ISBN 978-1-5247-6424-1.
- Kelly, Scott (2018). Infinite wonder: an astronaut's photographs from a year in space. New York: Alfred A. Knopf. ISBN 978-1-5247-3184-7.

== See also ==
- Ten longest human space flights
- A Beautiful Planet – IMAX documentary film showing scenes of Earth which features Kelly and other ISS astronauts

Preceded by Douglas H. Wheelock	ISS Expedition Commander; November 26, 2010, to March 16, 2011	Succeeded by Dmitri Kondratyev
Preceded by Gennady Padalka	ISS Expedition Commander; September 11, 2015, to March 1, 2016	Succeeded by Timothy Kopra
