= Endurance: A Year in Space, a Lifetime of Discovery =

US astronaut autobiography

- First edition (US)
- Author: Scott Kelly, Margaret Lazarus Dean
- Audio read by: Scott Kelly
- Language: English
- Genre: memoir
- Publisher: Alfred A. Knopf (US); Viking Press (UK)
- Publication date: October 17, 2017
- Publication place: United States
- Pages: 368
- ISBN: 978-1-5247-3159-5

Endurance: A Year in Space, a Lifetime of Discovery is a 2017 memoir by American astronaut Scott Kelly and Margaret Lazarus Dean. The book details Kelly's life, as well as that of his twin brother Mark, as they became naval aviators and test pilots, and were both selected for NASA Astronaut Group 16. Kelly recounts his four spaceflights, with an emphasis on the ISS year long mission, in which he participated.

The book's title was inspired by Endurance: Shackleton's Incredible Voyage, a 1959 book which detailed the epic efforts of Ernest Shackleton and his crew to survive after their exploratory ship the Endurance became trapped and was crushed by Antarctic sea ice in 1915. During his year aboard the Space Station, Kelly would occasionally thumb through the account of his predecessor explorer's harrowing story to try and put his own mission's inevitable difficulties in perspective.
