= Reduction in rank =

Military officer demotion

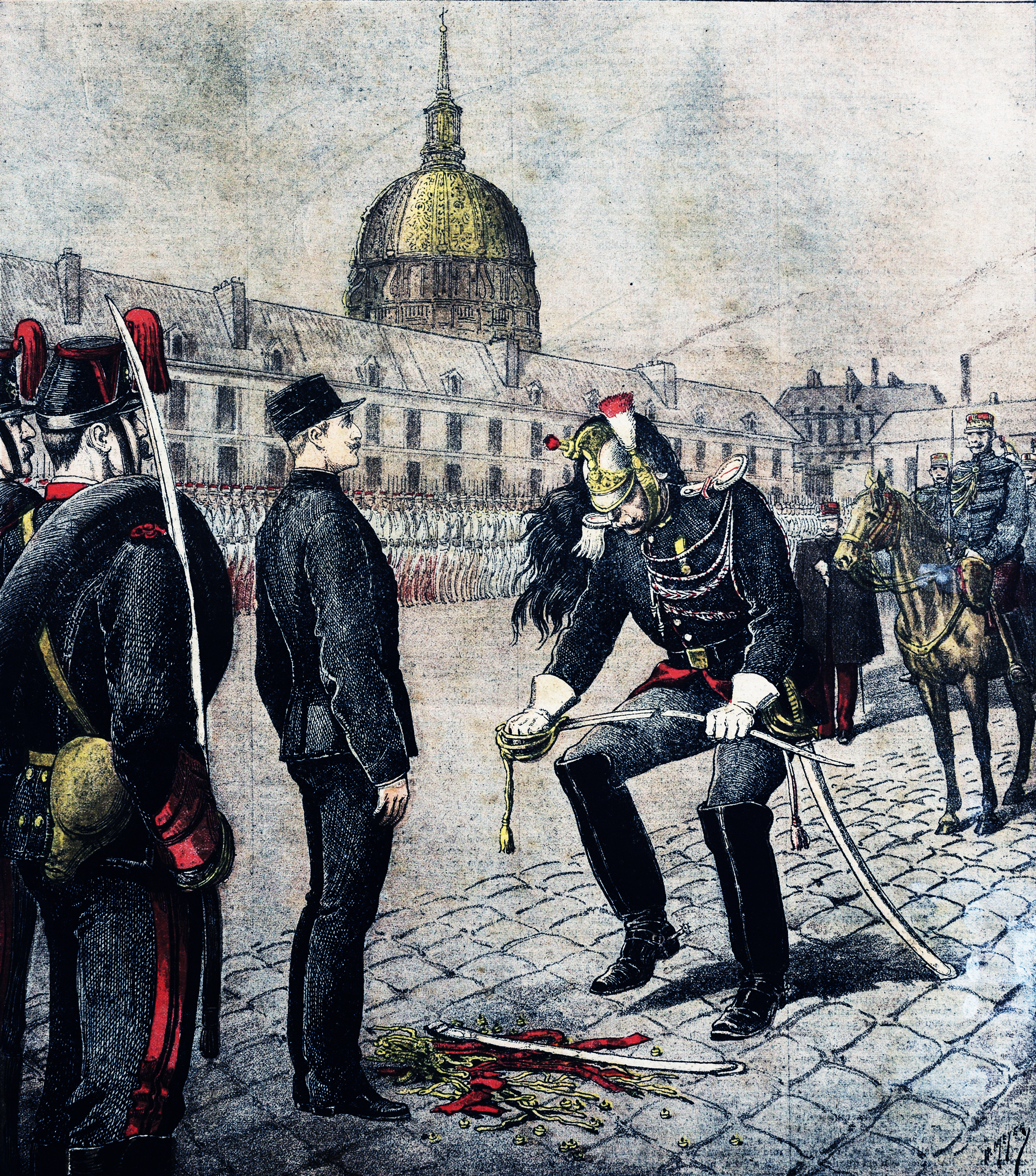
Alfred Dreyfus, 1895

Reduction in rank may refer to three separate concepts:

- In military law, a reduction in rank or degradation is a demotion in military rank as punishment for a crime or wrongdoing, imposed by a court-martial or other authority. It may be imposed in conjunction with other punishments, such as a bad conduct or dishonorable discharge, loss of wages, confinement to barracks, or imprisonment in a military prison.
- Reduction in rank may also refer to the voluntary, non-punitive practice of taking a lower rank, often as part of joining another military unit or military service. For example, those who join the Special Air Service or Australian Special Air Service Regiment take the rank of trooper, often a lower rank than their previous rank but with greater pay, prestige, and responsibilities.
- There is also a reversion in rank after an officer has been temporarily promoted to a higher rank while occupying a position requiring that rank; the officer reverts to the permanent rank on vacating the position bearing the higher rank. This occurs often in the U.S. military, to three- or four-star general or flag officers, who can be reduced in rank to no lower than their permanent rank of two-stars, as all ranks above two-stars are temporary, and are linked to their position's office. Reversion of this type is less usual for lower U.S. military ranks as such temporary promotions are uncommon.

== History ==
Reduction in rank (Latin gradus deiectio meaning position degradation) was a Roman military punishment.

== United States ==
In the United States, courts-martial may adjudge reduction to any enlisted member to the lowest or any intermediate pay grade. However, a summary court-martial may not sentence a person to reduction by more than one grade.

Article 15 of the Uniform Code of Military Justice (UCMJ) authorizes commanding officers to "in addition to or in lieu of admonition or reprimand" impose "reduction to the next inferior pay grade, if the grade from which demoted is within the promotion authority of the officer imposing the reduction or any officer subordinate to the one who imposes the reduction." Additionally, an officer of the grade of major, lieutenant commander, or above is authorized to impose "reduction to the lowest or any intermediate pay grade, if the grade from which demoted is within the promotion authority of the officer imposing the reduction or any officer subordinate to the one who imposes the reduction, but an enlisted member in a pay grade above E-4 may not be reduced more than two pay grades."

Additionally, article 58a of the UCMJ provides that, unless otherwise provided in regulation, an enlisted member above the pay grade of E-1 sentenced by a court-martial to confinement, a dishonorable or bad-conduct discharge, or hard labor without confinement, shall be automatically reduced to the pay grade of E-1.

== In other countries ==
In other countries, there is such a punishment, which is sometimes much more severe than that in the US. It usually is assigned for serious crimes in peacetime and wartime.

=== Russian Empire and USSR ===
In the Russian Empire and in the USSR, most often it was a demotion in rank to private. In the Russian Empire to this punishment was added also other penalties such as beatings with whips, which were all the staff. Personnel lined up in formation, then each dealt one blow sentenced. Most often, this has led to the death of the convict from his injuries.

Lieutenant-General Marquis Philip Osipovich Paulucci, being quartermaster general of the Caucasus army, on 3 November 1810, wrote in his diary: "the Tiflis infantry regiment non-commissioned officer Ermolaev, the former in the recruit depot when you split the party on the shelves, took the recruit 5 rubles brazenly. For any impermissible and intolerable service act, reduced thereof in the ordinary non-commissioned officer, require him to drive the rods through 500 people one time, and taken money from him to take away and give to a recruit. Flogging this very same to do tomorrow in 8 hours. This case put the body on view at the end of the Lord to the heads of regiments are strictly watched so that the lower ranks no one had injustices..."

=== USSR ===
In the USSR, demotion in rank to private begin to see use as a punishment immediately after the creation of the Red Army. As a rule, it punished those who made unforgivable mistakes during combat, especially those who led to serious losses or tactical defeat. It also punished those who committed serious crimes while serving. In the second case, a demotion in rank was usually not the only punishment administered, and often accompanied an imprisonment or execution. During the second world war, those demoted in rank were not imprisoned away from the front lines but instead made to serve in the penal divisions.

After the Second World War, the punishment no longer meant execution or service in a penal unit, but did mean dismissal from service and forfeiture of all military awards. Most often it was imposed for serious crimes which entail criminal liability. In post-Soviet Russia, this version of punishment is still used.

=== Germany ===
During the Third Reich, the SS officer Helmut Knochen was demoted in rank because, during the coup attempt of 20 July 1944, he did not adequately resist the conspirators, and got himself arrested.

== See also ==
- Cashiering
