= STS-134 =

2011 American crewed spaceflight to the ISS and final flight of Space Shuttle Endeavour

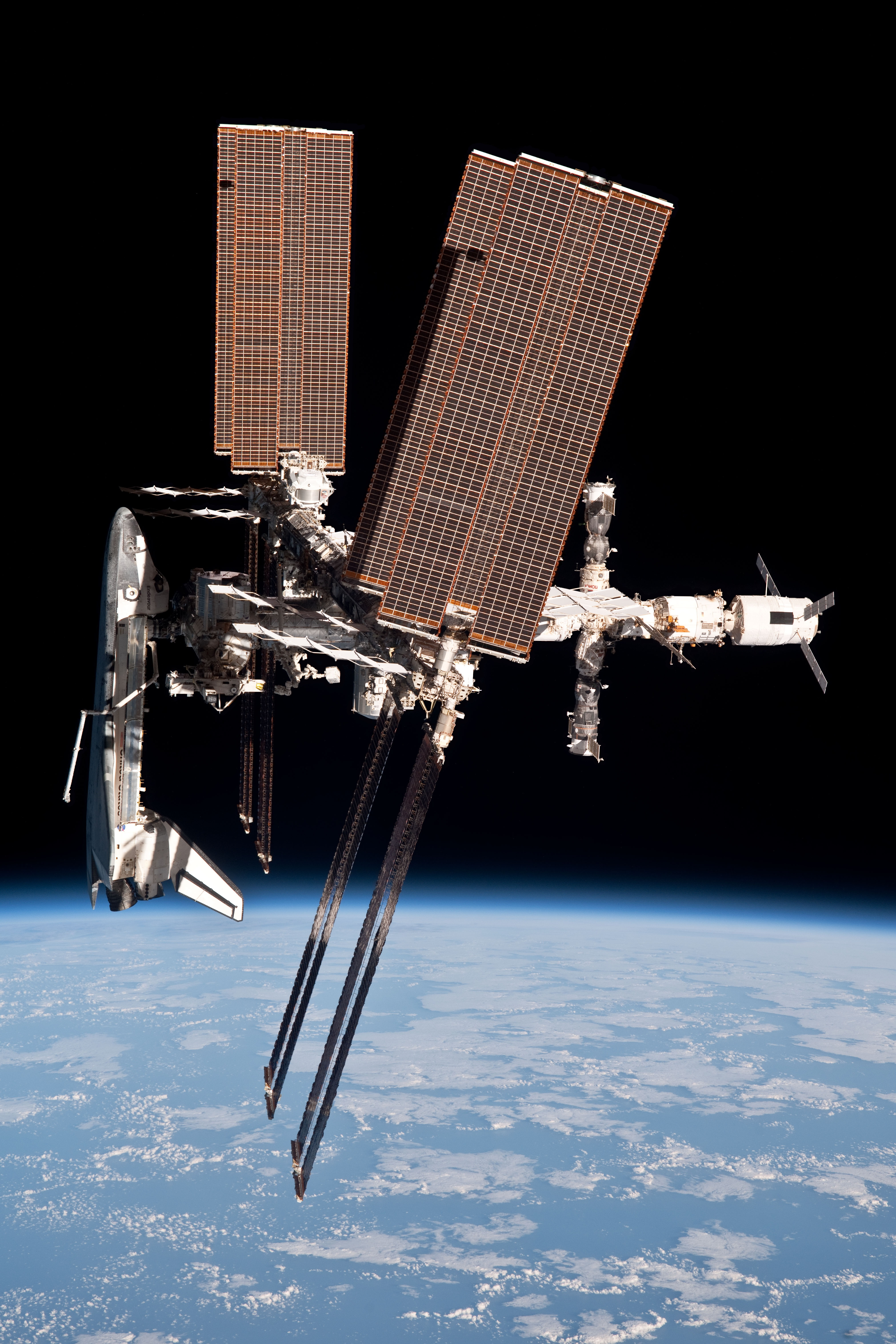
- Endeavour (left) docked to the ISS, viewed from Soyuz TMA-20; AMS-02 is visible as a white box atop the station's truss, between its solar arrays
- Names: Space Transportation System-134
- Mission type: ISS assembly
- Operator: NASA
- COSPAR ID: 2011-020A
- SATCAT no.: 37577
- Mission duration: 15 days, 17 hours, 38 minutes, 51 seconds
- Distance travelled: 10,477,185 km (6,510,221 mi)

Spacecraft properties
- Spacecraft: Space Shuttle Endeavour
- Launch mass: 2,052,443 kilograms (4,524,863 lb) (total); 121,830 kilograms (268,580 lb) (orbiter)
- Landing mass: 92,240 kilograms (203,354 lb)
- Payload mass: 15,770 kilograms (34,760 lb)

Crew
- Crew size: 6
- Members: Mark E. Kelly; Gregory H. Johnson; Michael Fincke; Roberto Vittori; Andrew J. Feustel; Gregory Chamitoff

Start of mission
- Launch date: May 16, 2011, 12:56:28 UTC (8:56:28 am ) EDT
- Launch site: Kennedy, LC-39A

End of mission
- Landing date: June 1, 2011, 06:35 UTC
- Landing site: Kennedy, SLF Runway 15

Orbital parameters
- Reference system: Geocentric
- Regime: Low Earth
- Perigee altitude: 321 kilometres (199 mi)
- Apogee altitude: 343 kilometres (213 mi)
- Inclination: 51.6 degrees
- Period: 91.17 minutes
- Epoch: May 17, 2011

Docking with ISS
- Docking port: PMA-2 (Harmony forward)
- Docking date: May 18, 2011, 10:14 UTC
- Undocking date: May 30, 2011, 03:55 UTC
- Time docked: 11 days, 17 hours, 41 minutes
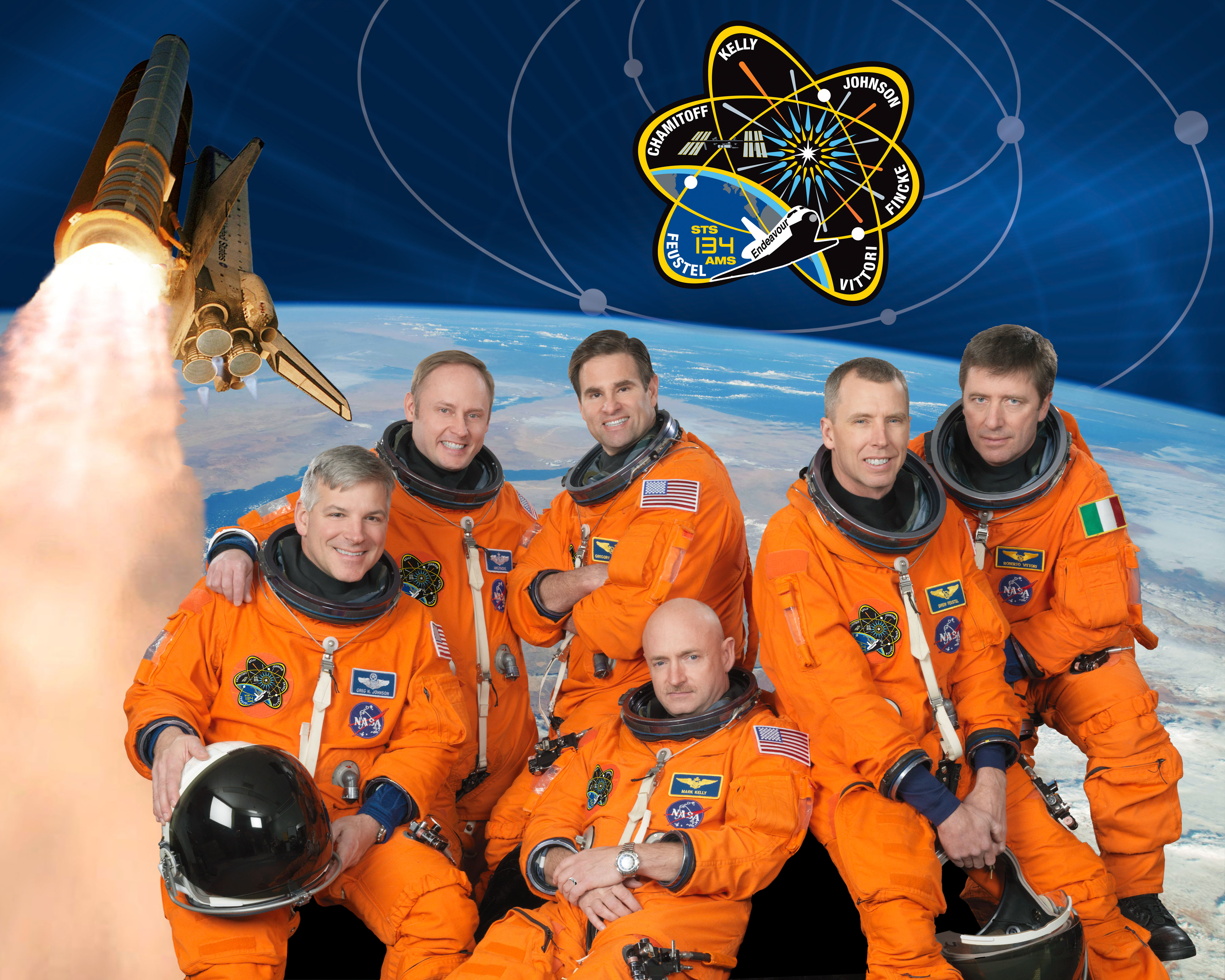
- Pictured clockwise in the STS-134 crew portrait are NASA astronauts Mark Kelly (bottom center), commander; Gregory H. Johnson, pilot; Michael Fincke, Greg Chamitoff, Andrew Feustel and European Space Agency's Roberto Vittori, all mission specialists. Space Shuttle program

STS-134 (ISS assembly flight ULF6) was the penultimate mission of NASA's Space Shuttle program and the 25th and last spaceflight of Space Shuttle Endeavour. This flight delivered the Alpha Magnetic Spectrometer and an ExPRESS Logistics Carrier to the International Space Station. Mark Kelly served as the mission commander. The European segment of the mission was called "DAMA".

STS-134 was expected to be the final Space Shuttle mission if STS-135 did not receive funding from Congress. However, in February 2011, NASA stated that STS-135 would fly "regardless" of the funding situation. STS-135, flown by Atlantis, took advantage of the processing for STS-335, the Launch on Need mission that would have been necessary if the STS-134 crew became stranded in orbit.

Changes in the design of the main payload, AMS-02, as well as delays to STS-133, led to delays in the mission. The first launch attempt on April 29, 2011, was scrubbed at 12:20 pm by launch managers due to problems with two heaters on one of the orbiter's auxiliary power units (APU). Endeavour launched successfully at 08:56:28 EDT (12:56:28 UTC) on May 16, 2011, and landed for the final time on June 1, 2011.

== Crew ==
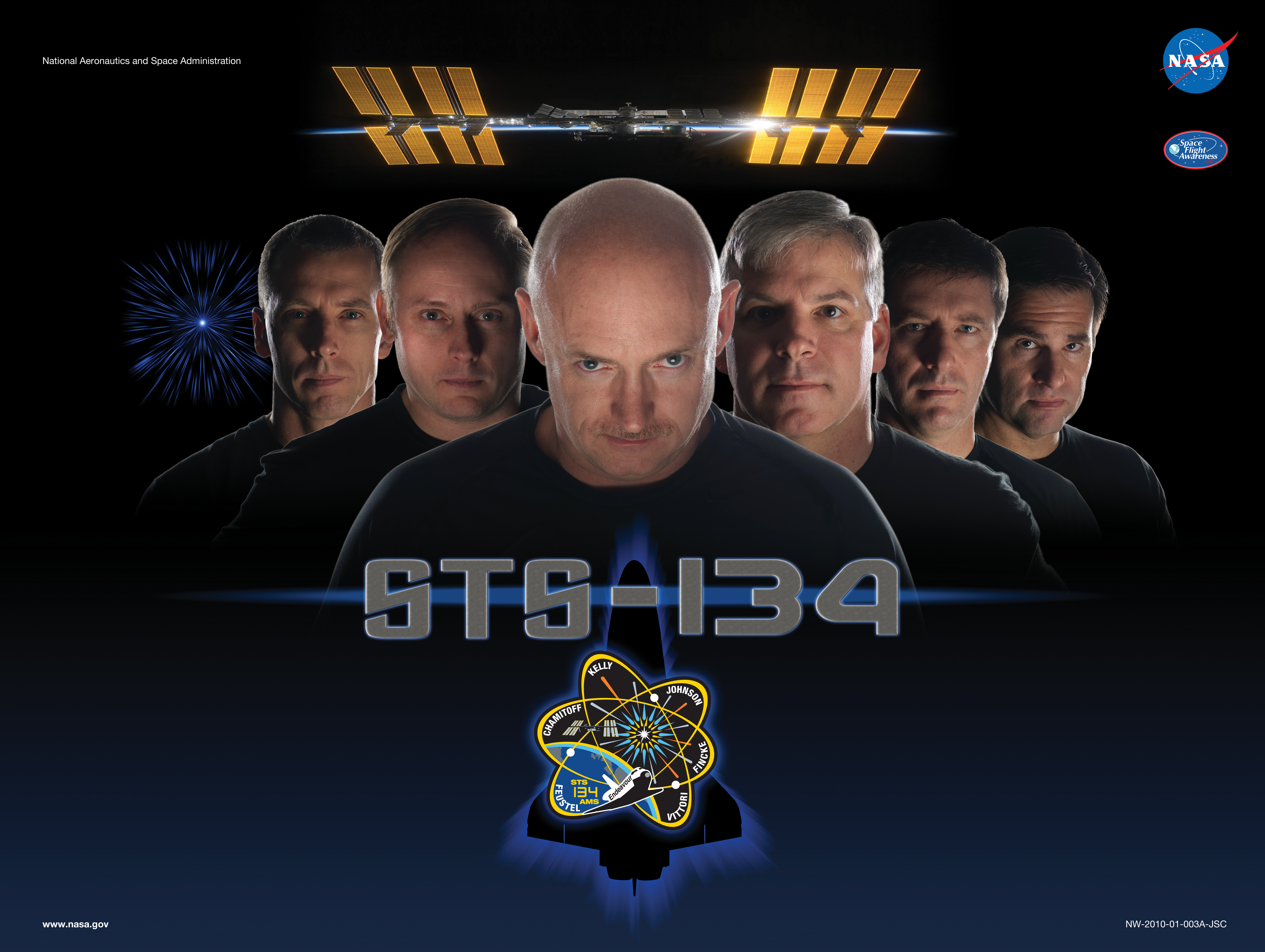
Mission poster, based on a Star Trek promotional poster.

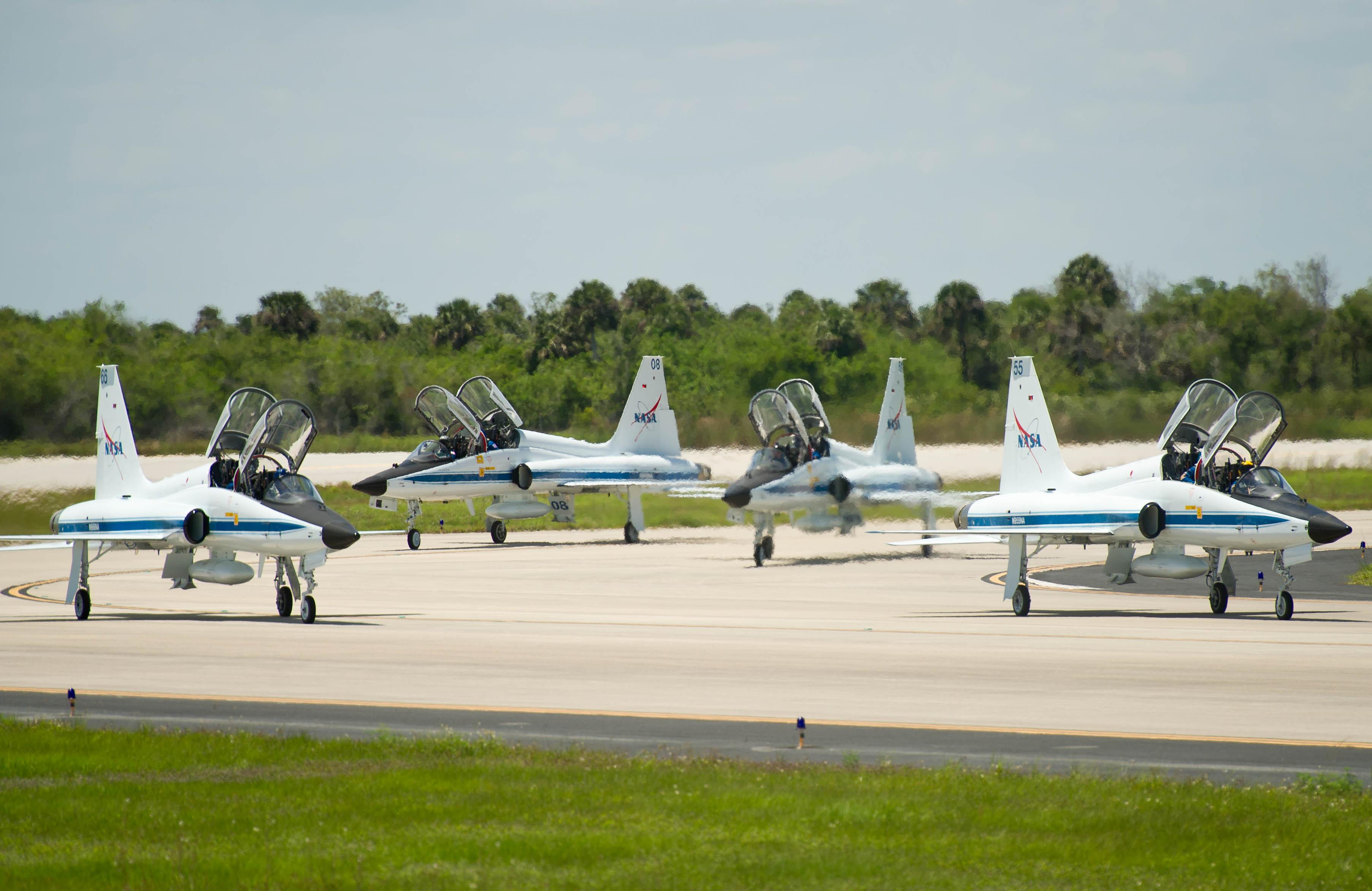
The crew arrive at the Shuttle Landing Facility in T-38 jets on April 26, 2011.

NASA announced the STS-134 crew on August 10, 2009.

Position	Astronaut
Commander	(United States) Mark Kelly; Fourth and last spaceflight
Pilot	(United States) Gregory H. Johnson; Second and last spaceflight
Mission Specialist 1	(United States) Michael Fincke; Third spaceflight
Mission Specialist 2 Flight Engineer	(Italy) Roberto Vittori, ESA; Third and last spaceflight
Mission Specialist 3	(United States) Andrew J. Feustel; Second spaceflight
Mission Specialist 4	(United States) Gregory Chamitoff; Second and last spaceflight
Notes: On January 13, 2011, after the 2011 Tucson shooting in which Congresswoman Gabrielle Giffords, Mark Kelly's wife, was critically wounded, NASA named Frederick W. Sturckow as backup commander for this mission.; Roberto Vittori from Italy was the last non-U.S. astronaut to fly with the shuttle.; This was the final Space Shuttle mission with a six-person crew.; This was the final shuttle mission with an all-male crew. STS-135 would have one female crew member, Sandra Magnus.

=== Crew seat assignments ===
Seat	Launch	Landing	Seats 1–4 are on the flight deck. Seats 5–7 are on the mid-deck.
1	Kelly		Seats 1–4 are on the flight deck. Seats 5–7 are on the mid-deck.
2	Johnson		Seats 1–4 are on the flight deck. Seats 5–7 are on the mid-deck.
3	Fincke		Seats 1–4 are on the flight deck. Seats 5–7 are on the mid-deck.
4	Vittori		Seats 1–4 are on the flight deck. Seats 5–7 are on the mid-deck.
5	Feustel		Seats 1–4 are on the flight deck. Seats 5–7 are on the mid-deck.
6	Chamitoff		Seats 1–4 are on the flight deck. Seats 5–7 are on the mid-deck.
7	Unused		Seats 1–4 are on the flight deck. Seats 5–7 are on the mid-deck.

== Background ==
STS-134 Space Shuttle launch

The Space Shuttle had been scheduled to be retired from service after STS-133, but controversy over the cancellation of several International Space Station components, most notably the Alpha Magnetic Spectrometer, in order to meet deadlines for the retirement of the shuttle, caused the United States Government to consider ordering an additional mission. On June 19, 2008, the United States House of Representatives passed the NASA Authorization Act of 2008, giving NASA funding for one additional mission to "deliver science experiments to the station".

The same mandate was included in the U.S. Senate version of the NASA Authorization Act that was unanimously approved by the Senate Committee on Commerce, Science, and Transportation on June 25, 2008. It was amended and passed by the full Senate on September 25, 2008, passed by the House on September 27, 2008, and signed by President George W. Bush on October 15, 2008. Bush had previously opposed any additional shuttle missions, as they could delay the transition to Project Constellation. In the spring of 2009, the Obama Administration included funds for the STS-134 mission in its proposed 2010 NASA budget.

STS-134 was planned to be the final regularly scheduled mission of the NASA Space Shuttle Program, but with the passing in 2011 of an appropriations bill authorizing the conversion of STS-335 to STS-135, this was no longer the case. It was also originally scheduled to coincide with Expedition 26 before delays in the Space Shuttle launch schedule pushed it past that Expedition. If STS-134 had launched during Expedition 26, then Mark Kelly and Expedition 26 commander Scott Kelly would have become the first siblings (and twins) to fly in space at the same time.

Shuttle Commander Mark Kelly's wife, U.S. Representative Gabby Giffords, flew to the Kennedy Space Center (KSC) in Florida to view the first launch attempt, her first trip since moving from Tucson to Houston for rehabilitation after being seriously wounded in the January 2011 Tucson shooting. On May 16, Giffords was again at KSC for the launch, which was "one of the most anticipated in years," according to The New York Times.

U.S. President Barack Obama scheduled a visit to Kennedy Space Center on April 29, 2011, to view the launch, and despite the canceled launch attempt he toured an Orbiter Processing Facility at Launch Complex 39 and met with Giffords and the six crewmembers.

== Mission payload ==
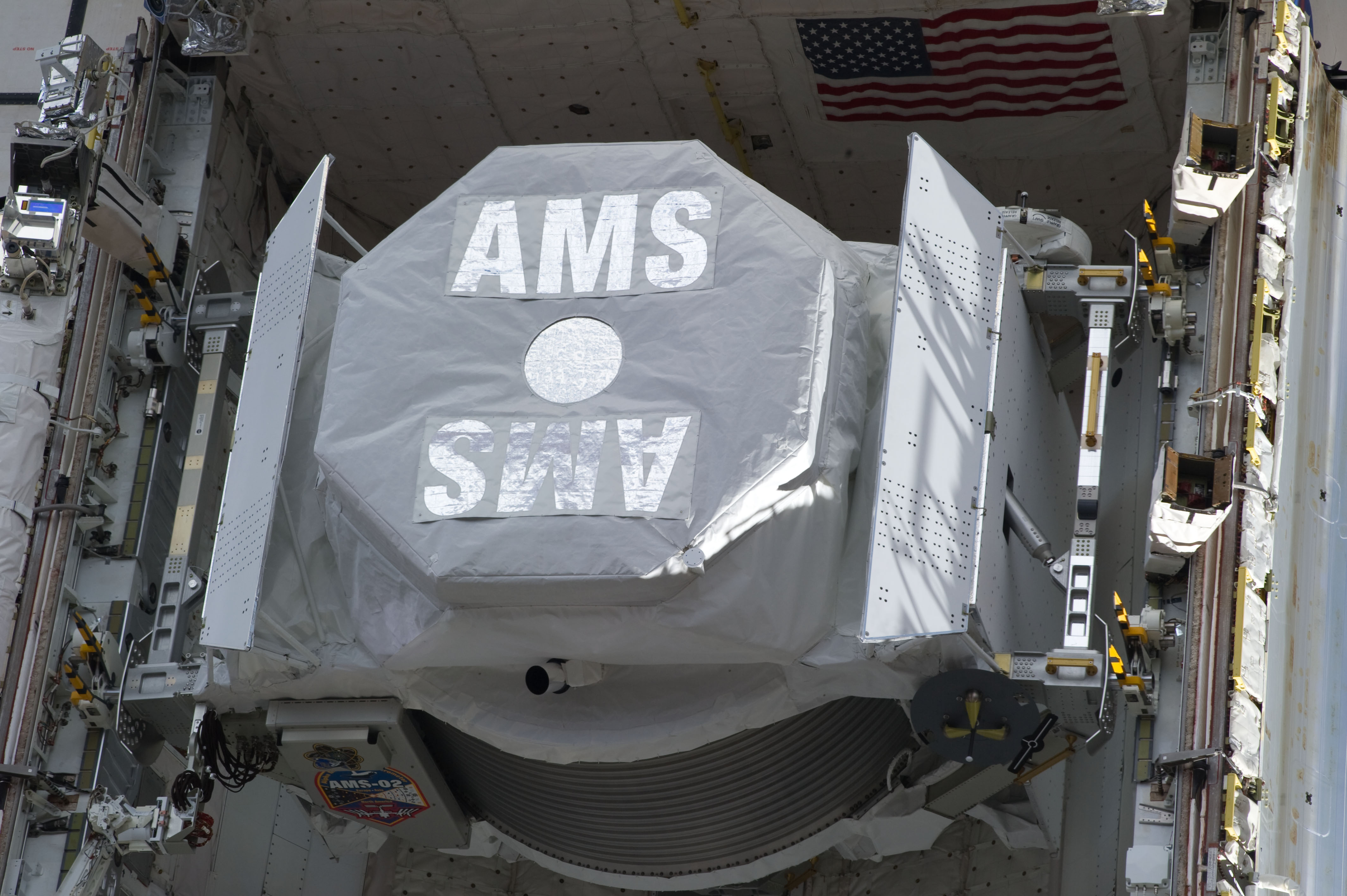
AMS-2 inside Endeavour's payload bay shortly before it was installed on the ISS

=== Alpha Magnetic Spectrometer 2 ===
The Alpha Magnetic Spectrometer 2 (AMS-02) was carried to the ISS in Endeavour's payload bay, and was attached to the ISS's S3 truss segment. The AMS-02 unit is a particle physics detector which contains a large permanent magnet, and is designed to search for antimatter and investigate the origin and structure of dark matter.

According to the original design plan, a cryogenic, superconducting magnet system was developed for the AMS-02. This was reported by NASA to be a critical technology, granting the instrument the high sensitivity needed to achieve mission objectives. Late in its development, however, poorly understood anomalous heating in the cryogenic magnet system was discovered. As a result, the AMS-02 experiment leader, Samuel C. C. Ting, decided to replace the superconducting magnet inside the spectrometer with the permanent magnet previously used in AMS-01.

=== ExPRESS Logistics Carrier 3 ===
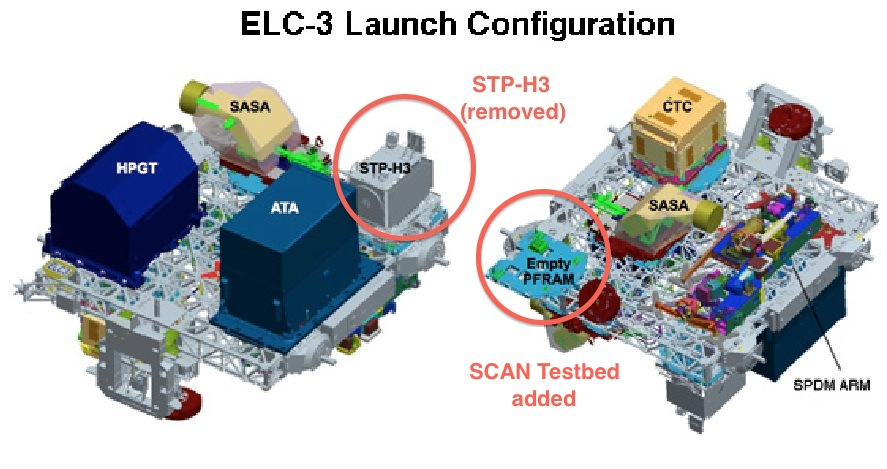
ELC-3 in its launch configuration

The ExPRESS Logistics Carrier 3 (ELC3) carried several Orbital Replacement Units (ORU) that were too large or too heavy for other spacecraft to carry to the ISS. These ORUs included a High Pressure Gas Tank (HPGT), an Ammonia Tank Assembly (ATA), the S band Antenna Sub-System Assembly #2 & 3 (SASA), a Special Purpose Dextrous Manipulator (SPDM) Arm with Orbital Replacement Unit change-out mechanism, a Space Test Program Houston 3 Department of Defense payload, and a spare ELC pallet controller avionics box.

=== Materials on International Space Station Experiment ===
The STS-134 mission delivered the Materials on International Space Station Experiment 8 (MISSE) experiments, and returned the completed MISSE 7 experiments to Earth. MISSE 7 had been delivered to the ISS on STS-129 in 2009.

=== Sensor Test of Orion Rel-nav Risk Mitigation Detailed Test Objective kit ===
The Orion Rel-nav Sensor was mounted on the Orbiter Docking System (ODS) in Trajectory Control Sensor slot 1 and on an Adaptive Payload Carrier in the bay 3 port of the Payload Bay. For the STORRM Detailed Test Objective (DTO), after Endeavour undocked, it completed its normal fly-around of the station. The crew then guided Endeavour back towards the station, flying a nominal orbiter trajectory for docking to the ISS's Pressurized Mating Adapter-2. However, the shuttle did not actually dock with the ISS again; instead, it was positioned below the station.

On STS-131, the docking target on the ISS was enhanced with reflectors, to allow for the characterization of the Orion Rel-Nav sensors' performance during STS-134's rendezvous and proximity operations with the ISS. These proximity operations were tested during approach and docking, undocking, flyaround (time permitting), and during a modified separation from the ISS. During the modified separation, the crew performed a series of re-rendezvous burns that put the orbiter on an Orion-like rendezvous profile. Afterwards, instead of re-docking to the ISS, the crew performed a full separation.

=== GLACIER Freezer Module ===
STS-134 carried a new Glacier module to the ISS and returned two old ones to Earth. The Glacier units were used to store and return science samples on the Space Shuttle.

=== Orbiter Boom Sensor System ===
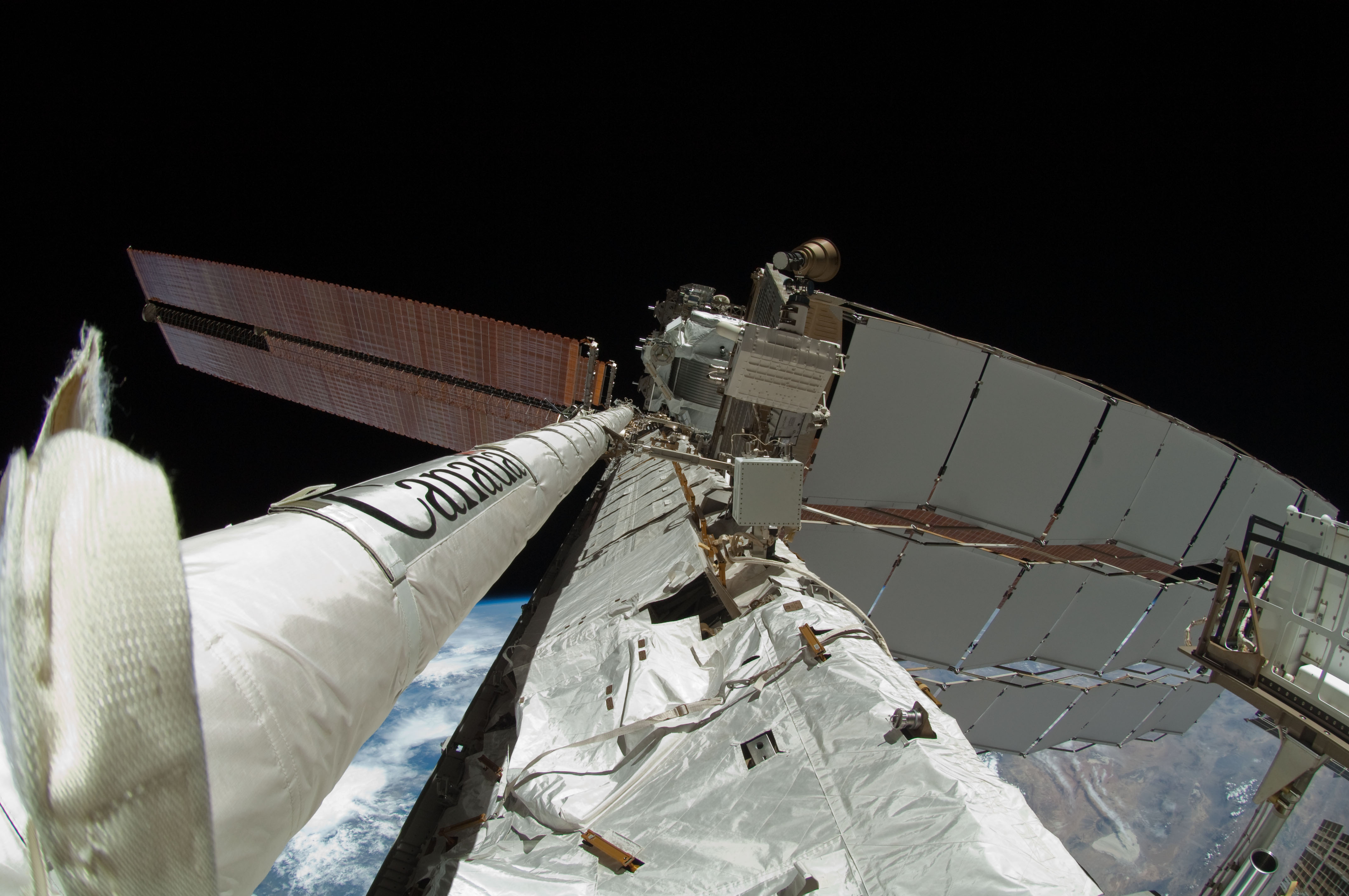
The newly attached OBSS at the Space Station

STS-134 left its Orbiter Boom Sensor System (OBSS) permanently on the ISS for use in reaching places that the Canadarm2 cannot get to on its own. The usefulness of having an OBSS available for use at the station was demonstrated during Scott Parazynski's repair of the torn P6 solar panel on STS-120. The feasibility of leaving an OBSS attached to ISS for a long period of time was demonstrated when the STS-123 mission left one behind for use during the subsequent STS-124 mission.

=== Lego kits ===
Endeavour brought 13 Lego kits to the ISS, where astronauts built Lego models to see how they would react in microgravity, as part of the Lego Bricks in Space program. The results were shared with schools as part of an educational project.

=== Shuttle LIFE ===
The LIFE precursor mission was launched aboard Endeavour. This Planetary Society project was to test the mission destined for Fobos-Grunt. The stage rehearsal was deemed fully successful.

=== STEM Bars ===
Endeavour brought specialized nutrition bars, called "STEM Bars", to the ISS. These were created by high school students and sisters Mikayla and Shannon Diesch. The nutrition bars were certified for spaceflight by meeting a specific NASA-developed nutritional profile, and had to pass strict microbial testing. The STEM Bars were flown to support the work of the Battle Creek, Michigan-based sisters to raise awareness of the importance of STEM education among their peers, an outreach effort which they started after they won the 2010 Conrad Foundation Spirit of Innovation Awards.

=== The Little Mole ===
A figurine of the Little Mole was successfully brought back to Earth by Andrew Feustel. It was later presented to the character's creator, Zdeněk Miler, and used for space science popularization mainly in the Czech Republic.

== Mission experiments ==
Endeavour performed four Department of Defense payloads of opportunity: MAUI, SEITI, RAMBO-2, and SIMPLEX. All four of these experiments required engine and thruster firings, and were to be completed only if there was sufficient propellant on board Endeavour.

== Mission milestones ==
The mission marked:

- 165th NASA crewed space flight
- 134th Shuttle mission since STS-1
- 25th and last flight of Endeavour
- 36th Shuttle mission to the ISS
- 109th post-Challenger mission
- 21st post-Columbia mission
- Last non-US astronaut to fly on a Space Shuttle mission (Col. Roberto Vittori, Italy)
- First Papal blessing and call to astronauts in space
- 99th day launch
- 132nd landing overall, 77th at KSC, 25th night landing, and 19th night landing at KSC
- Penultimate Space Shuttle Mission

== Shuttle processing ==
=== Rollout ===
Rollout of Endeavour commenced on March 10, 2011, at 19:56 EST and terminated on March 11, 2011, at 03:49 EST.

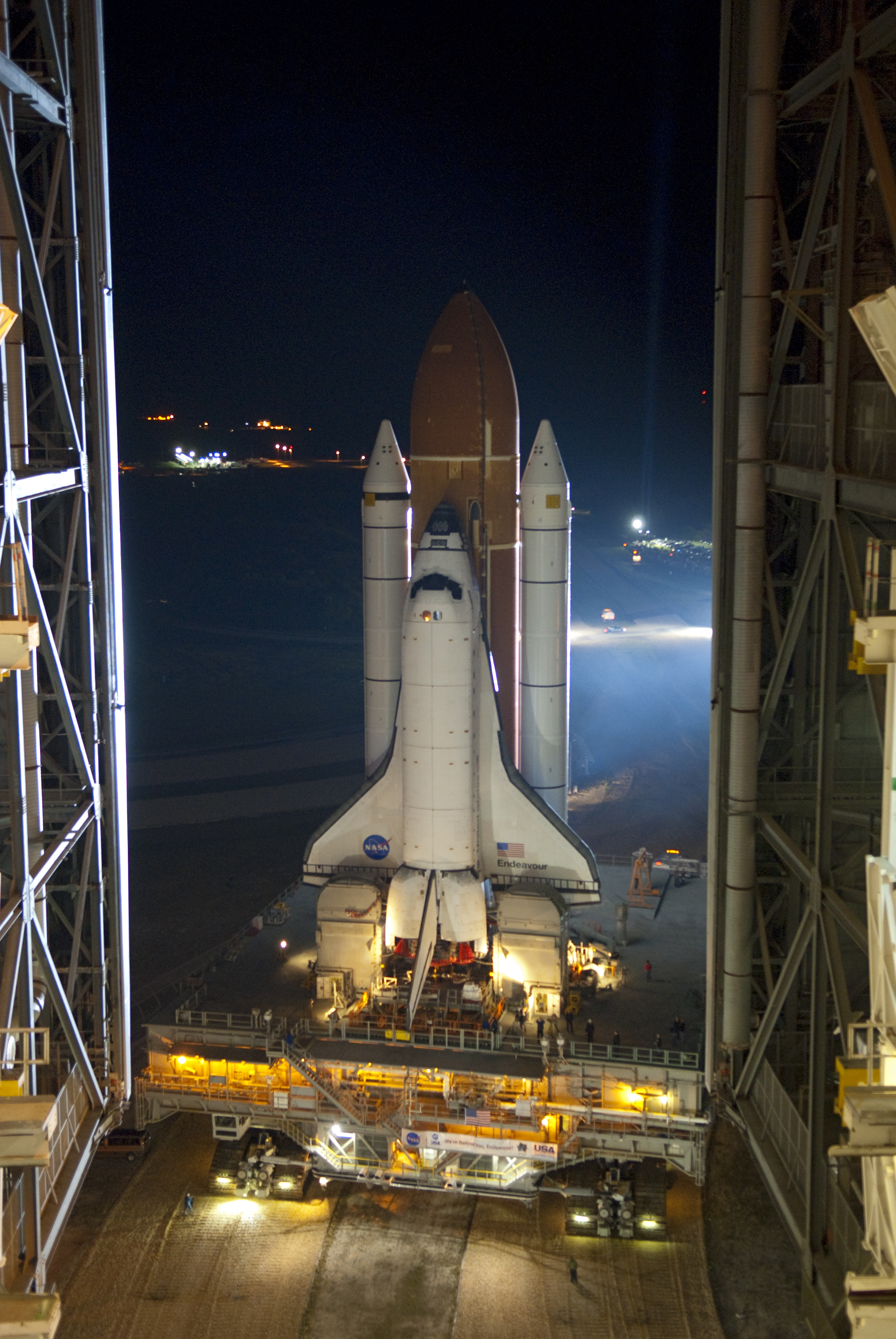
Endeavour leaving the Vehicle Assembly Building

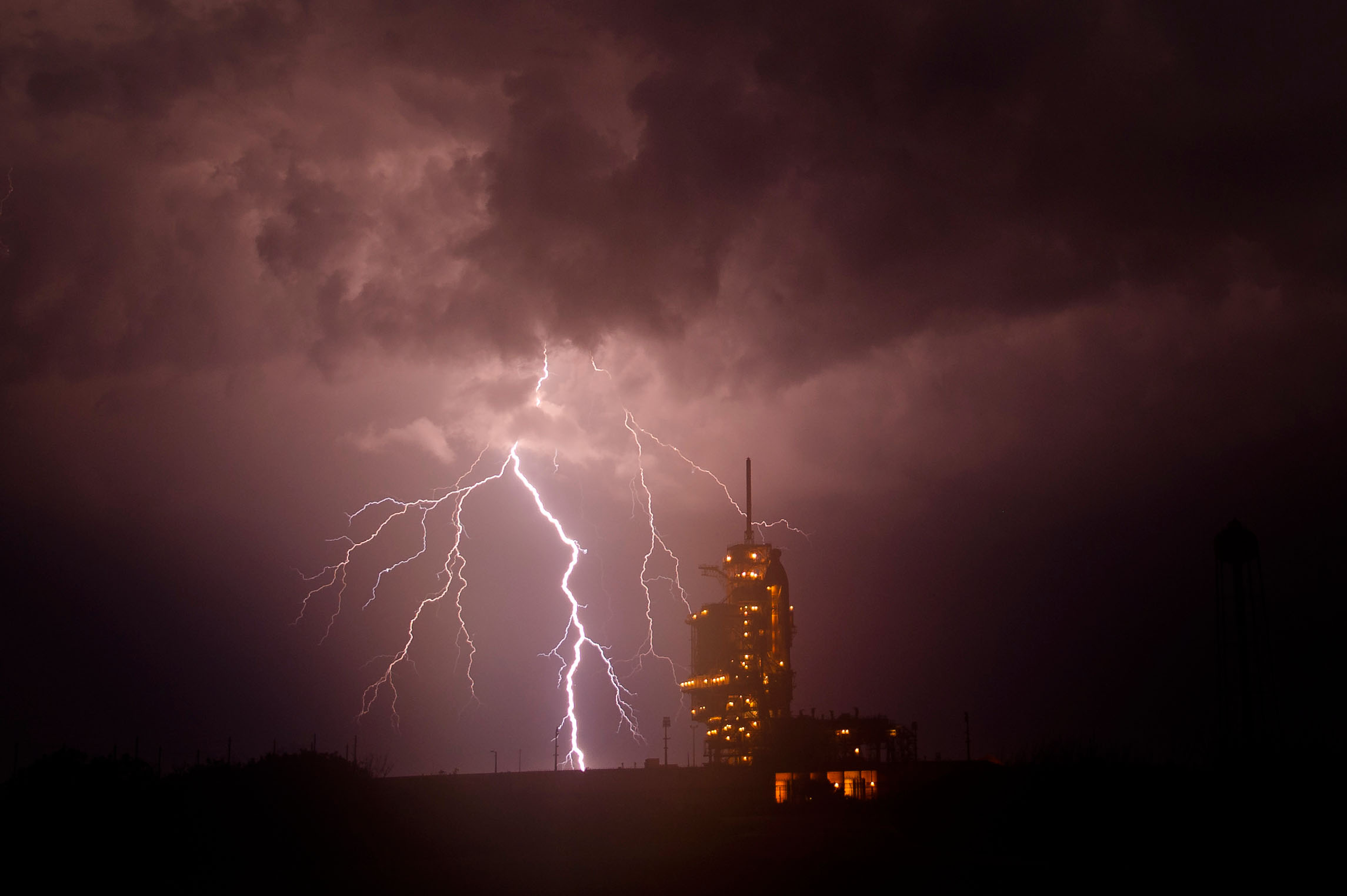
Endeavour sitting on Launch Pad 39A as a storm passes over on 28 April 2011

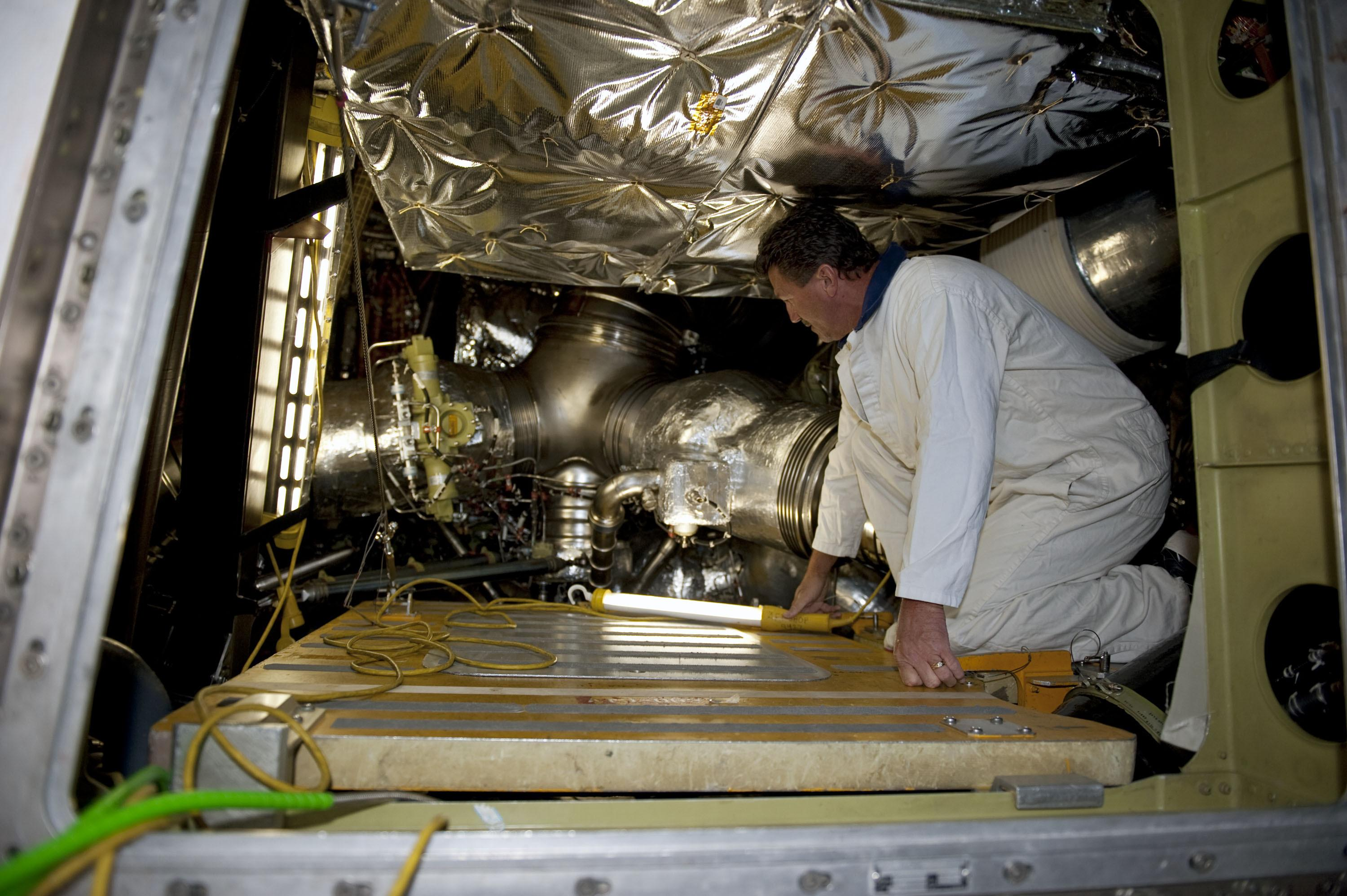
A technician works to remove and replace the aft Load Control Assembly 2.

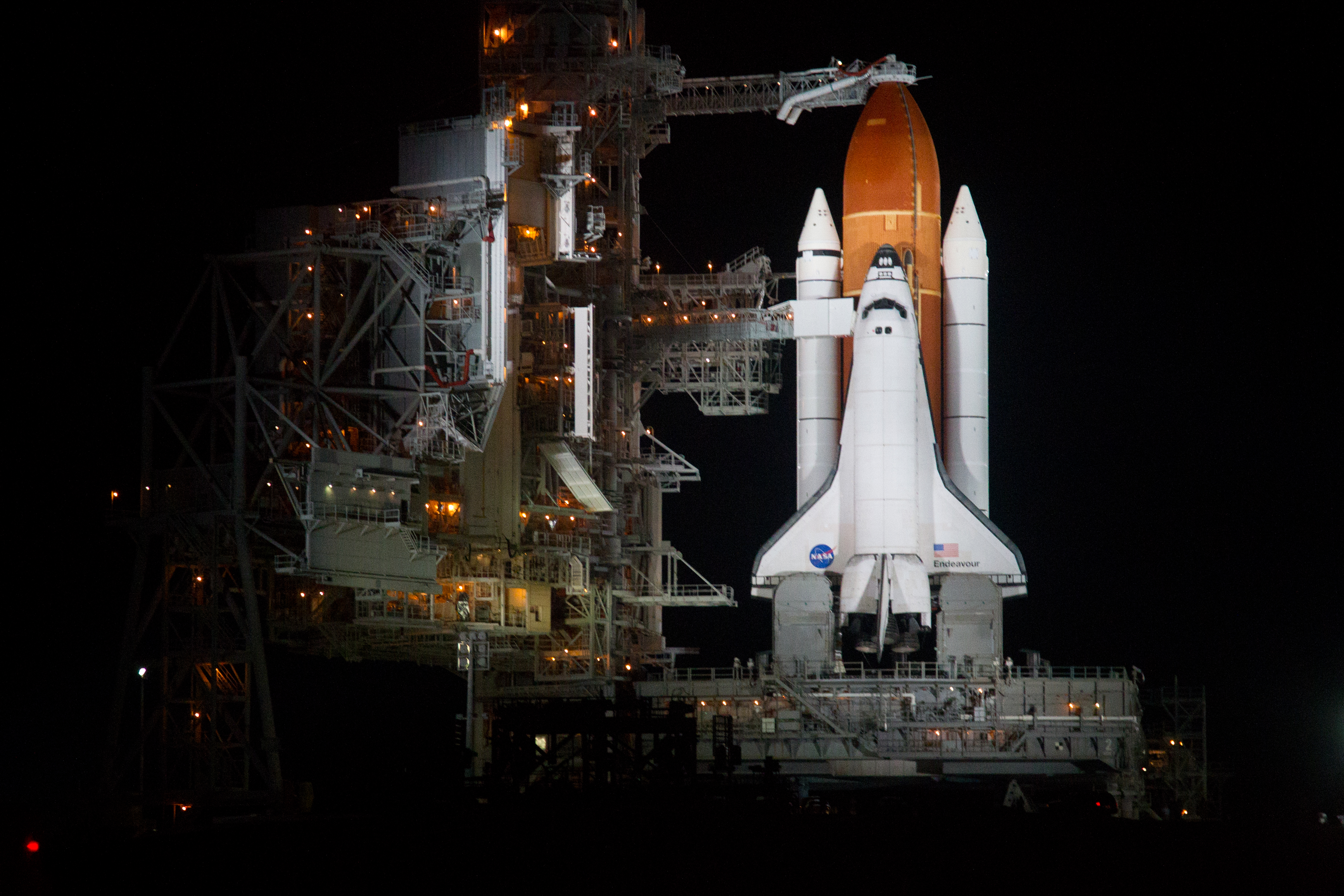
Endeavour sitting on Launch Pad 39A

=== Launchpad fatality ===
At around 07:40 EDT on March 14, 2011, United Space Alliance engineer James Vanover committed suicide by jumping from the STS-134 launchpad. Endeavour was at the pad when the incident occurred. As a result, work on the Space Shuttle was suspended for the day while grief counseling was offered to the workforce. NASA officials believed this to be the first launchpad fatality since 1981.

== Launch attempts ==
Attempt	Planned	Result	Turnaround	Reason	Decision point	Weather go (%)	Notes
1	29 Apr 2011, 3:47:52 pm	Scrubbed	—	Technical	29 Apr 2011, 12:20 pm (T−02:36:01)	70%	Heater failure in auxiliary-power-unit
2	16 May 2011, 8:56:00 am	Success	16 days 17 hours 8 minutes			70%	

== Mission timeline ==
=== May 16 (Flight Day 1 – Launch) ===
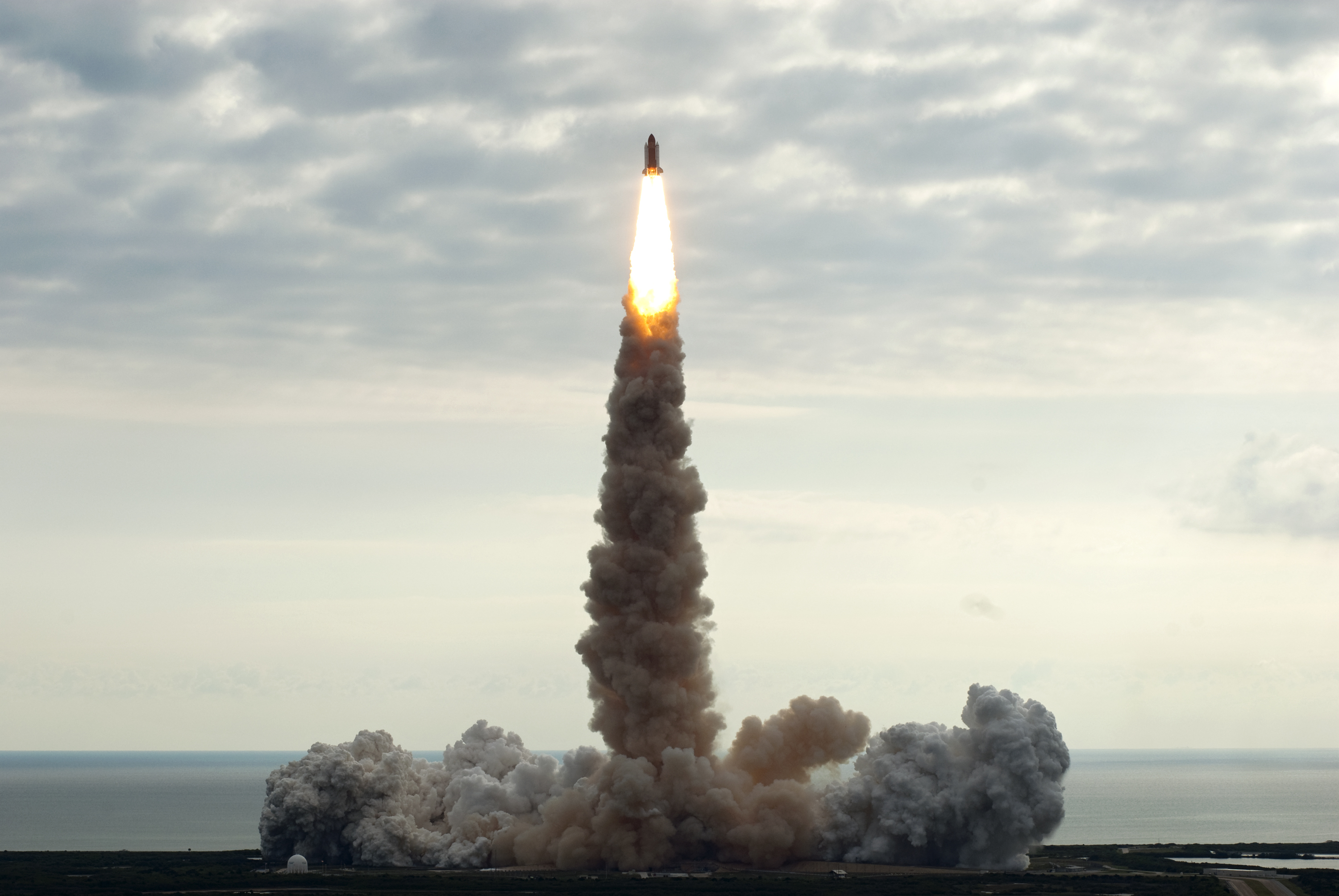
Space Shuttle Endeavour launches from Kennedy Space Center on STS-134.

Endeavour lifted off from Kennedy Space Center's Launch Complex 39 at 08:56 EDT on May 16, 2011. The launch of Endeavour came after an on-time tanking process which filled the shuttle's external tank with more than 1,900,000 L (500,000 US gallons) of liquid oxygen and liquid hydrogen; the tanking started at 23:36 EDT on May 15, 2011. Once the shuttle and crew were on-orbit, they set about preparing the shuttle for the mission ahead. The first tasks they completed were opening the payload bay doors, activating the K_{u}-band antenna, and activating the Shuttle Remote Manipulator System (SRMS), also known as the Canadarm. Prior to this, commander Mark Kelly and pilot Greg Johnson completed an engine firing, known as the OMS-2 burn, to circularize the orbit of the shuttle. They also completed another engine firing, the NC-1 burn, to help the shuttle catch up to the International Space Station (ISS). After completing these initial tasks, the crew activated the Alpha Magnetic Spectrometer, allowing it to be monitored by teams on the ground. Later in the crew's work day, they downlinked video recordings that had been shot of the external tank by mission specialist Mike Fincke.

STS-134 launch video (9 mins 31 secs).

Endeavour's external tank falls to Earth.

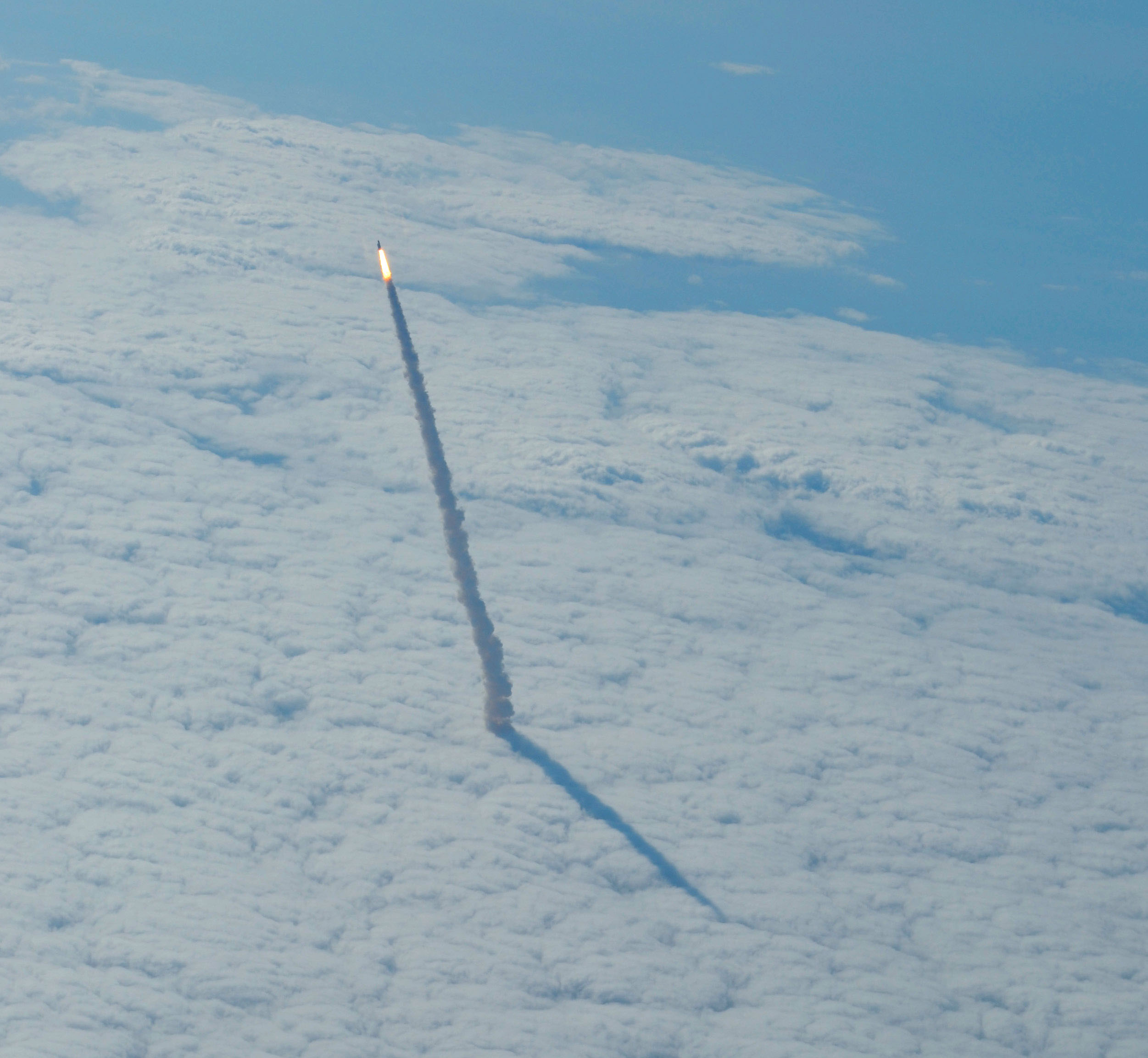
The launch of Endeavour seen from a shuttle training aircraft.

=== May 17 (Flight Day 2 – OBSS inspection) ===
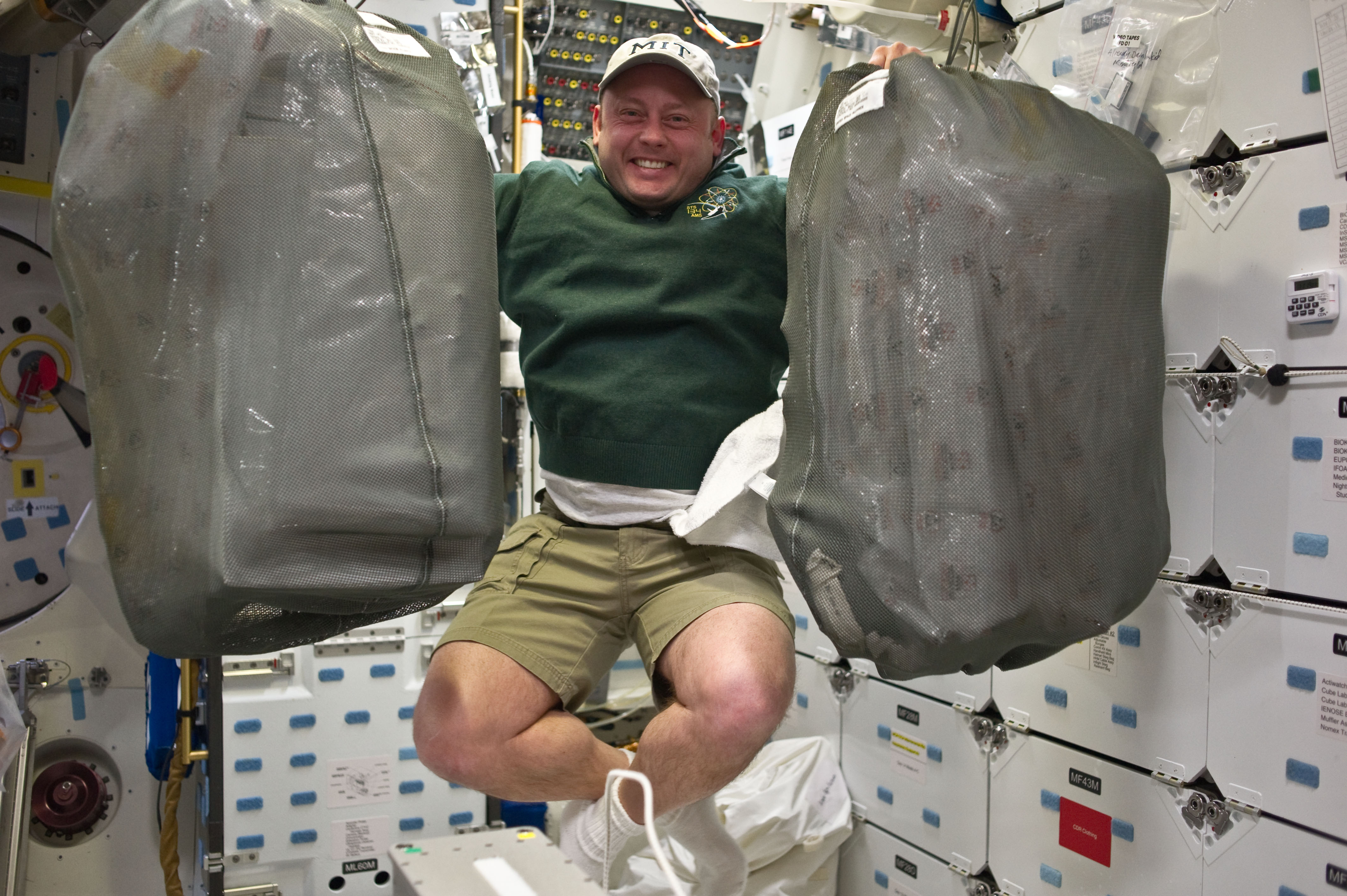
Mike Fincke lifts massive bags and floats freely inside Endeavour.

On flight day 2, the crew of Endeavour completed several tasks in preparation for the docking on flight day 3. The first and most important of these tasks was surveying the shuttle's Thermal Protection System (TPS). The Orbiter Boom Sensor System (OBSS) was used to survey the wing leading edge and nose cone. The Shuttle Remote Manipulator System (SRMS, or Canadarm 1) was also used to look at the thermal tiles and blankets on and around the Orbital Maneuvering System (OMS) pods. After the survey was complete, the Express Logistics Carrier (ELC) 3 was grappled by the SRMS. While the survey was conducted by Greg Johnson and mission specialists Roberto Vittori and Greg Chamitoff, the rest of the crew prepared the orbiter for docking. This included installing tools such as a center-line camera in the Orbiter Docking System, along with various other sensors used to gauge distance and speed. Kelly and mission specialists Mike Fincke and Drew Feustel furthermore checked out the two spacesuits carried on Endeavour, in preparation for the mission's four planned spacewalks.

=== May 18 (Flight Day 3 – ISS rendezvous and ELC installation) ===
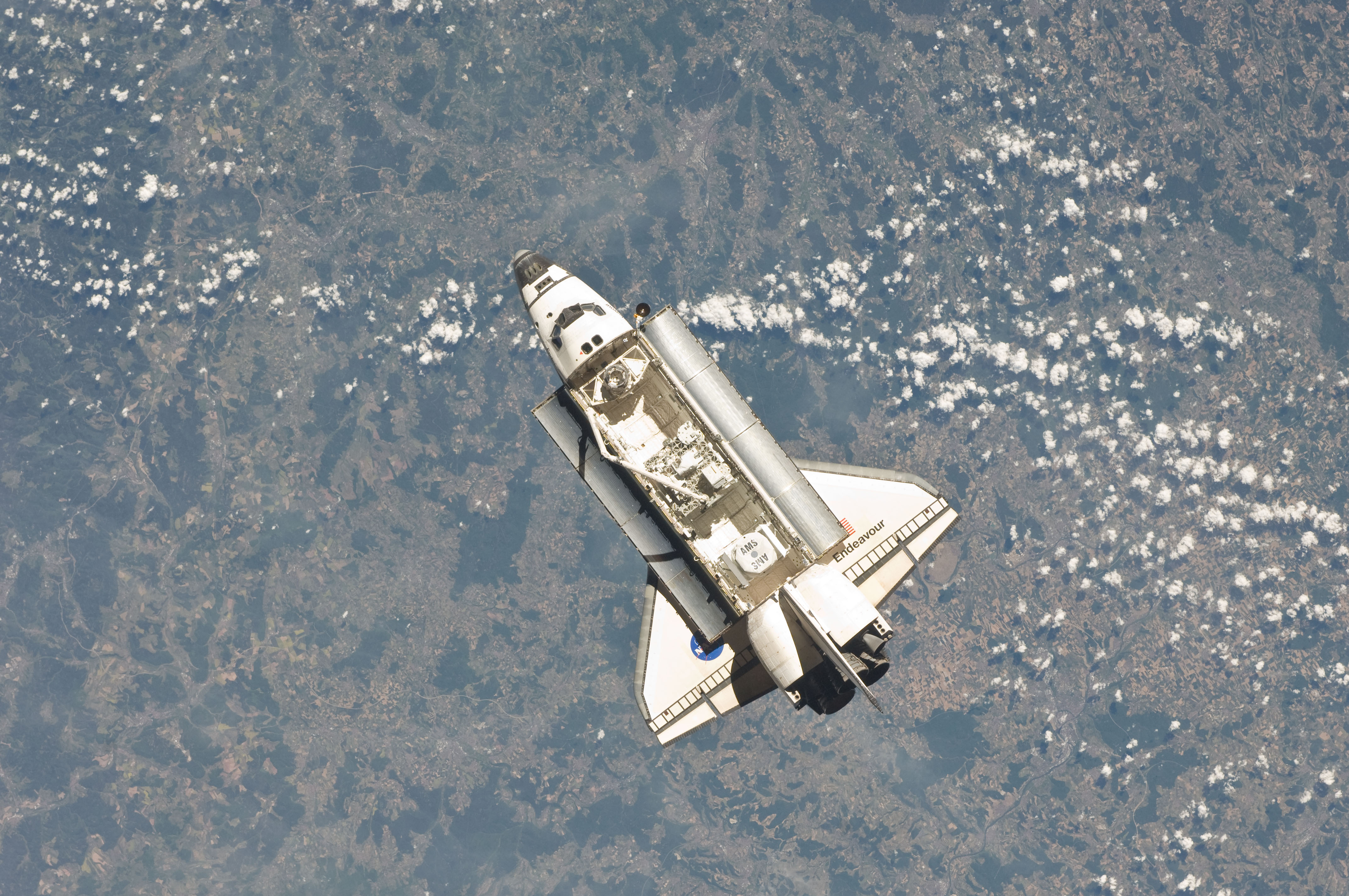
Endeavour approaches the space station.

Flight day 3 saw the docking of Endeavour to the Pressurized Mating Adapter (PMA) 2 on the ISS. The docking occurred on May 18, 2011, at 10:14 UTC. After the shuttle docked, the six astronauts of STS-134 joined the Expedition 27 crew on board the ISS. The joint crews completed a series of leak checks and opened the hatches at 11:38 UTC. Once the hatches were open, the joint crew held a welcome ceremony and completed a safety briefing. The first task for the joint crew was to unberth the Express Logistics Carrier (ELC) 3, and attach it to its final location on the ISS's Port 3 (P3) truss segment. Express Logistics Carrier 3 was removed from the payload bay of Endeavour by the SRMS and handed off to the Space Station Remote Manipulator System (SSRMS), also known as Canadarm2. The ELC 3 was finally installed at 16:18 UTC. Kelly began to transfer oxygen from space shuttle Endeavour to the ISS. Mike Fincke and Drew Feustel transferred the two Extravehicular Mobility Units (EMU) to the ISS's Quest Airlock in preparation for their use during the mission's four spacewalks.

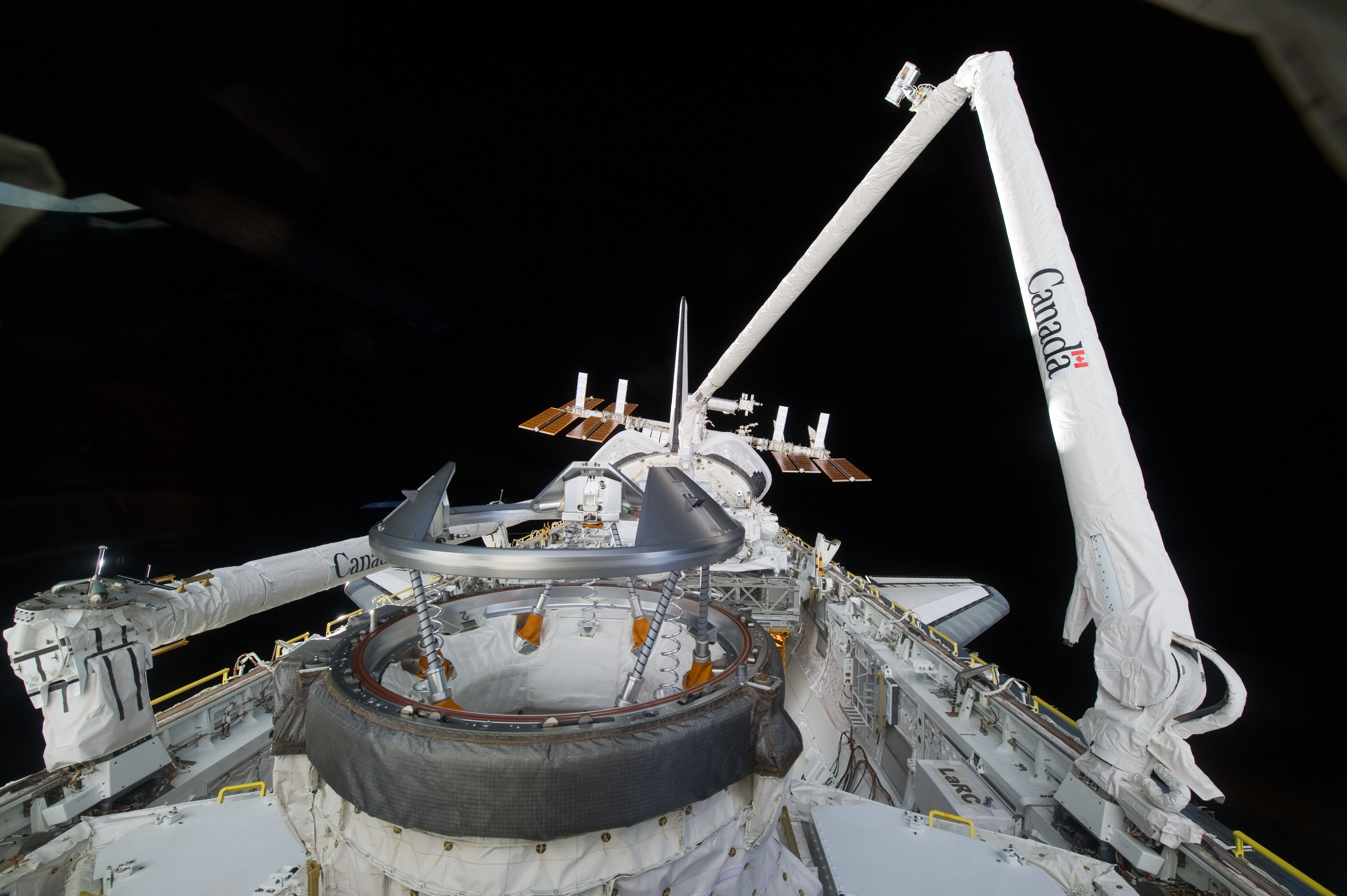
With an extended docking ring Endeavour approaches the ISS.

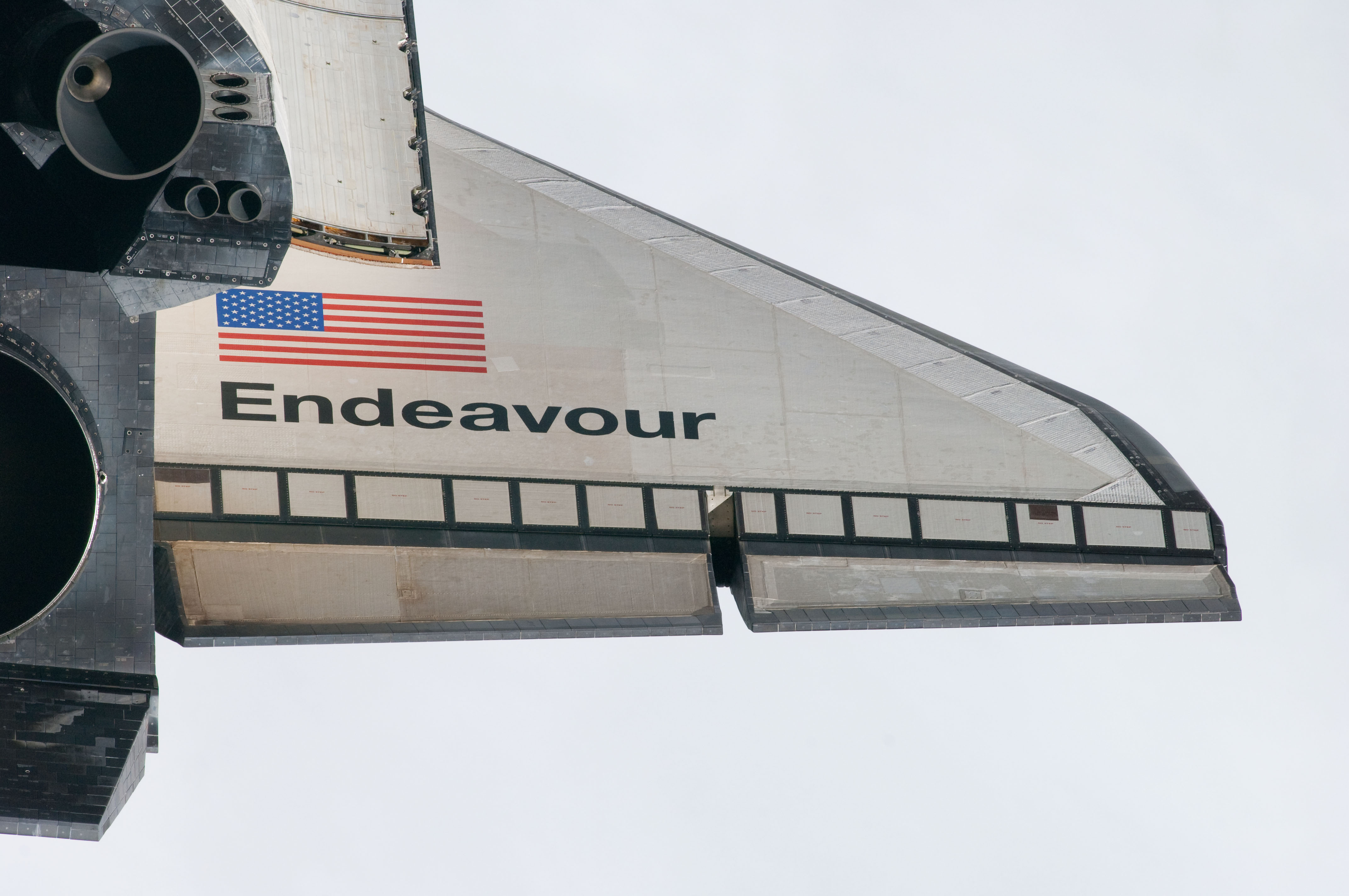
Endeavour's starboard wing photographed by a ISS crew member.

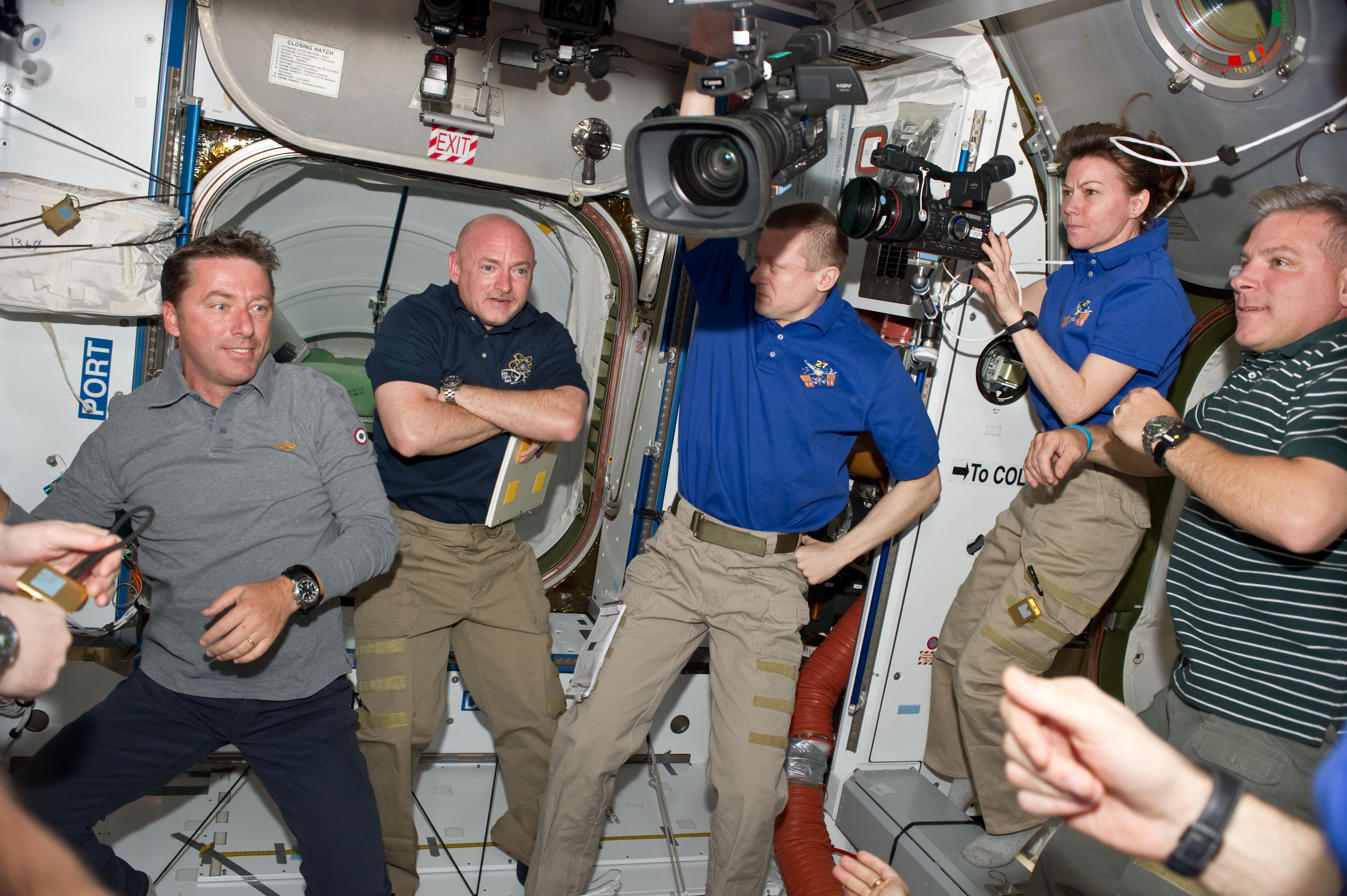
STS-134 and Expedition 27 crew inside the Harmony node shortly after docking.

=== May 19 (Flight Day 4 – AMS-2 installation) ===
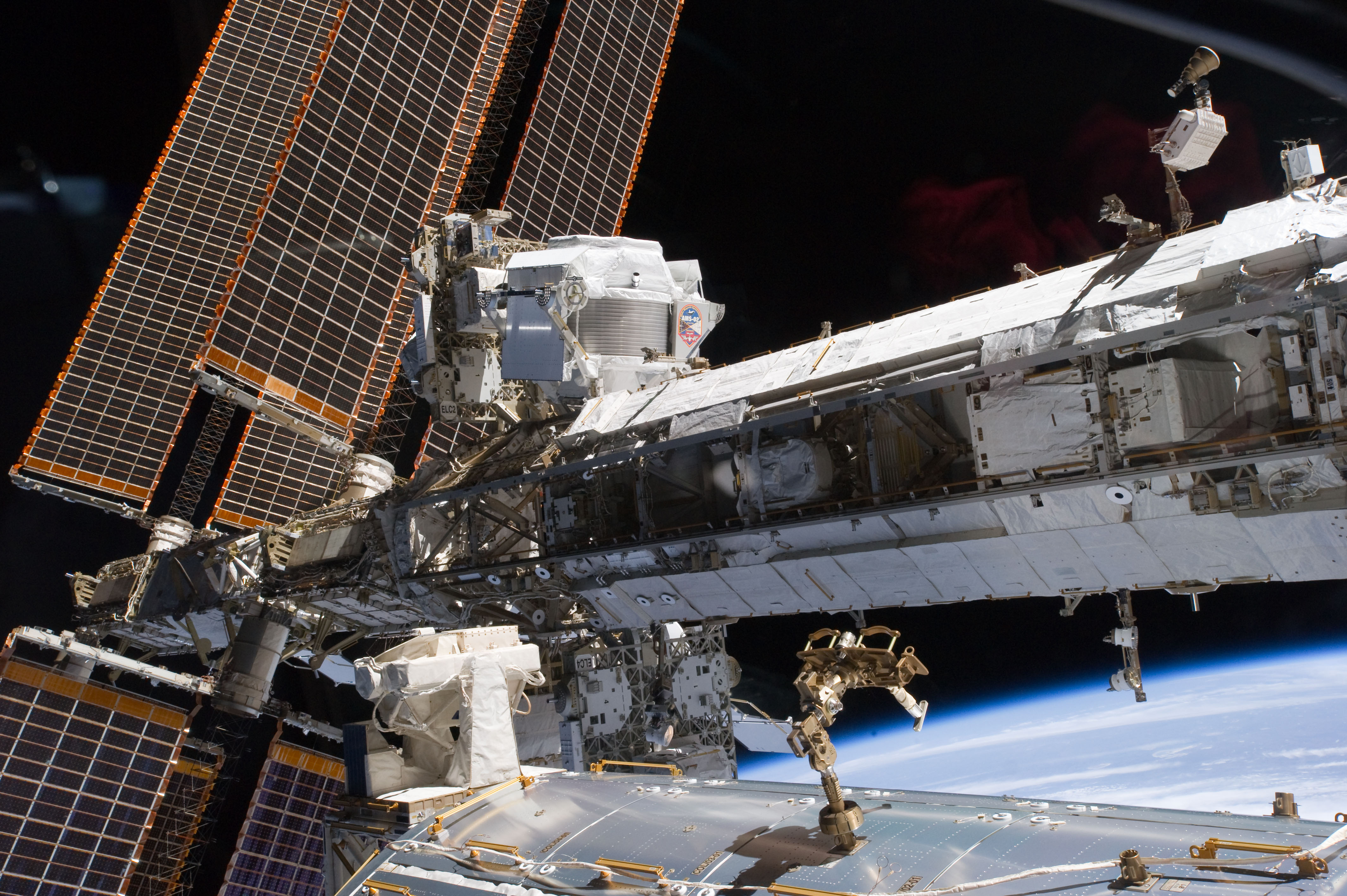
ISS Starboard truss with the newly installed AMS-02

The STS-134 crew installed the AMS-2 on flight day 4. AMS-2 was lifted out of Endeavour's payload bay using the Canadarm, operated by Drew Feustel and Roberto Vittori. It was handed off to Canadarm2, which was operated by Greg Chamitoff and Greg Johnson, and was installed in its final location on the S3 truss segment at 09:46 UTC. Immediately after the installation, crews on the ground began activating the experiment. The installation of the AMS-2 marked the completion of the US Orbital Segment of the International Space Station. Later in the day, Greg Chamitoff, Drew Feustel and Mike Fincke prepared the Extravehicular Mobility Units (EMU) that Chamitoff and Feustel would wear during their spacewalk on flight day 5. The trio was also assisted by commander Mark Kelly in preparing the tools required for the Extravehicular Activity (EVA). While this was going on, Expedition 27 crew members Paolo Nespoli, Cady Coleman and Ron Garan assisted the rest of the STS-134 crew in completing transfers to and from Endeavour. Late in the crew day, the two crews performed an EVA procedures review. After the review, Chamitoff and Feustel camped out in the Quest Airlock overnight, in preparation for the mission's first spacewalk. The campout was done with the airlock's air pressure reduced, so as to purge nitrogen bubbles from the astronauts' blood and thus prevent decompression sickness. Members of both crews also conducted two in-flight interviews with media on the ground, including PBS NewsHour, National Public Radio, Associated Press, Reuters and Fox News. The crew also answered questions that were relayed up to them by Miles O'Brien for Google.

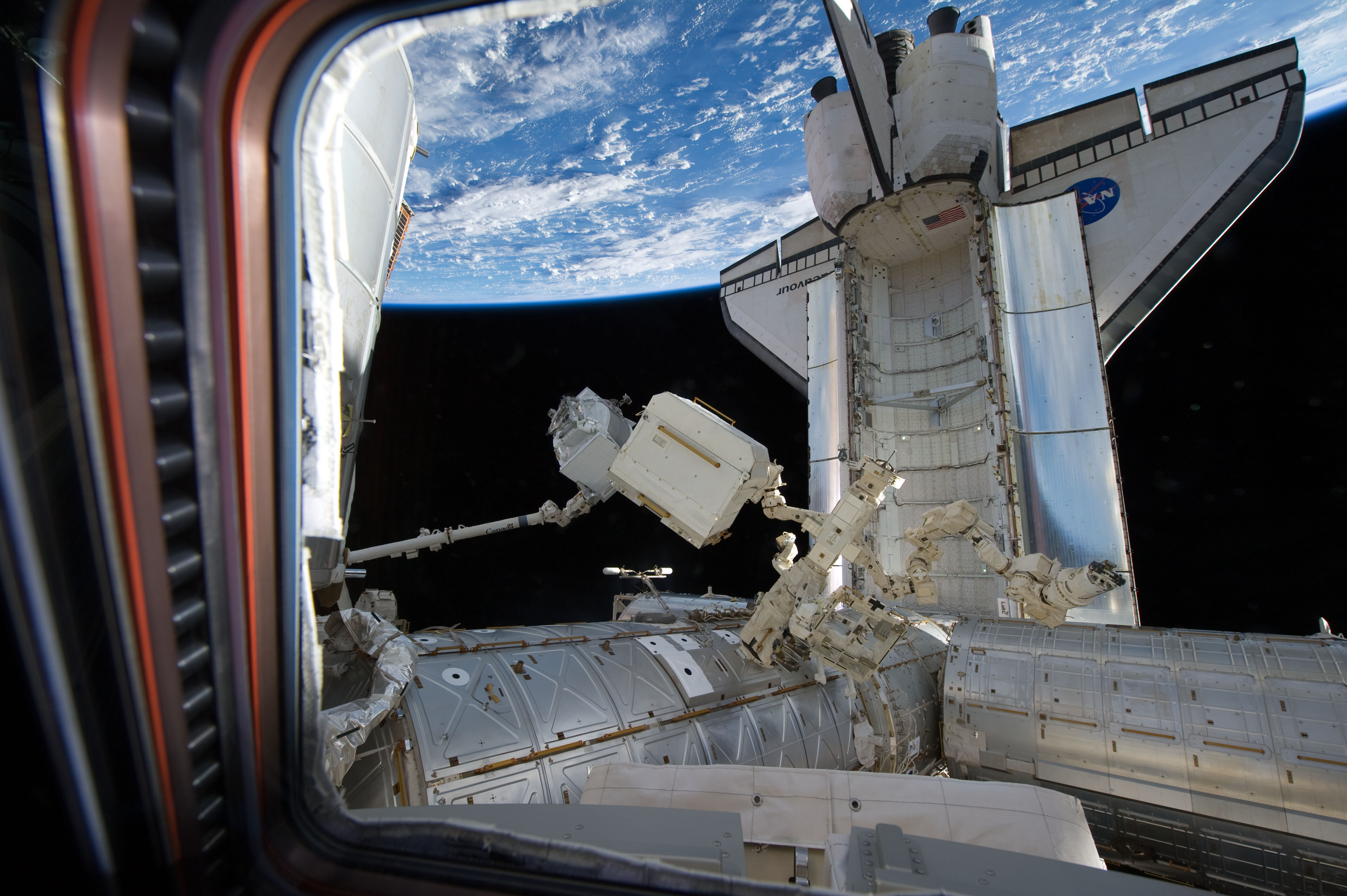
Dextre in the center as Station's Canadarm2 transfers AMS-02 for installation

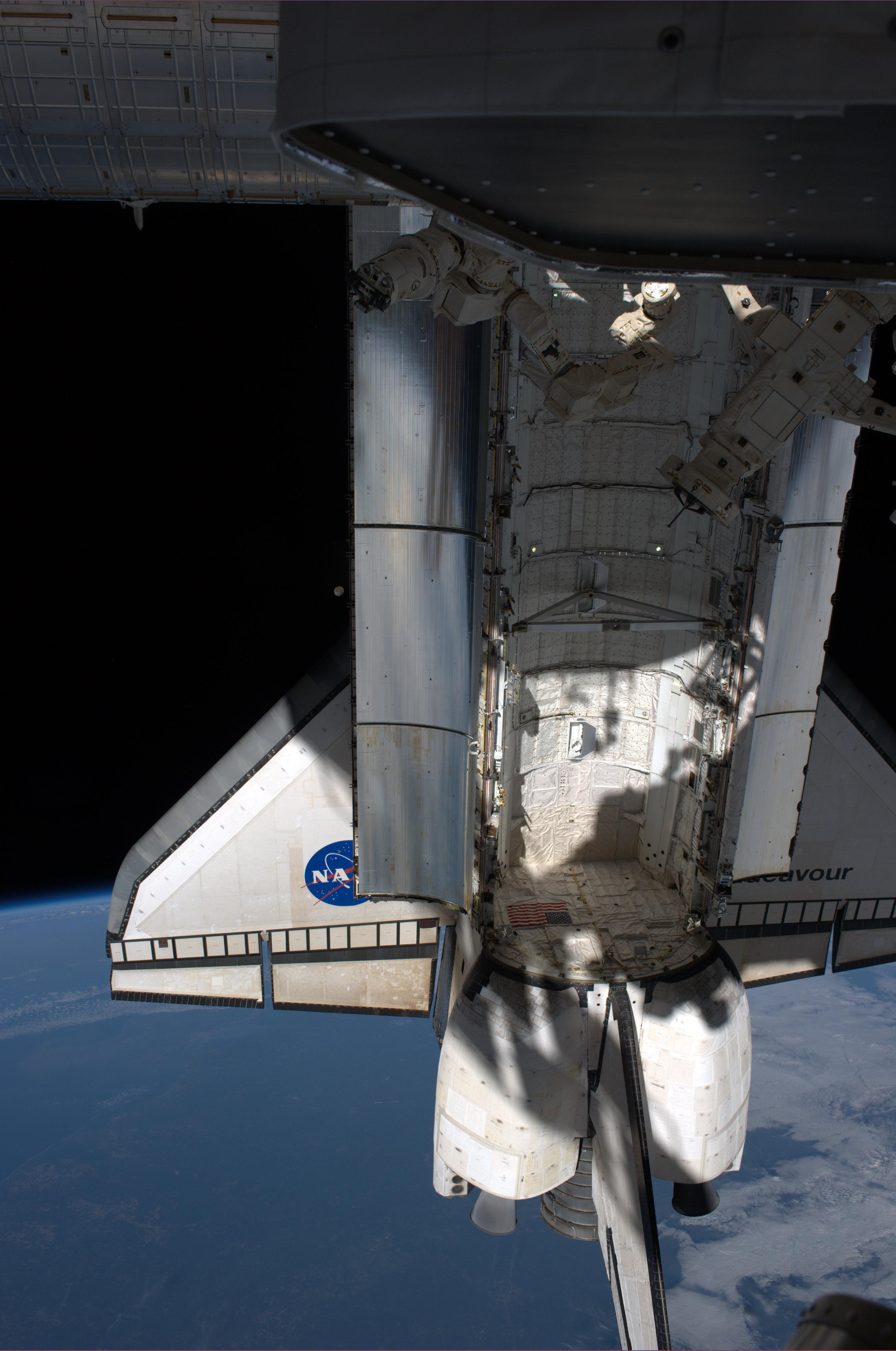
Endeavour docked at the ISS

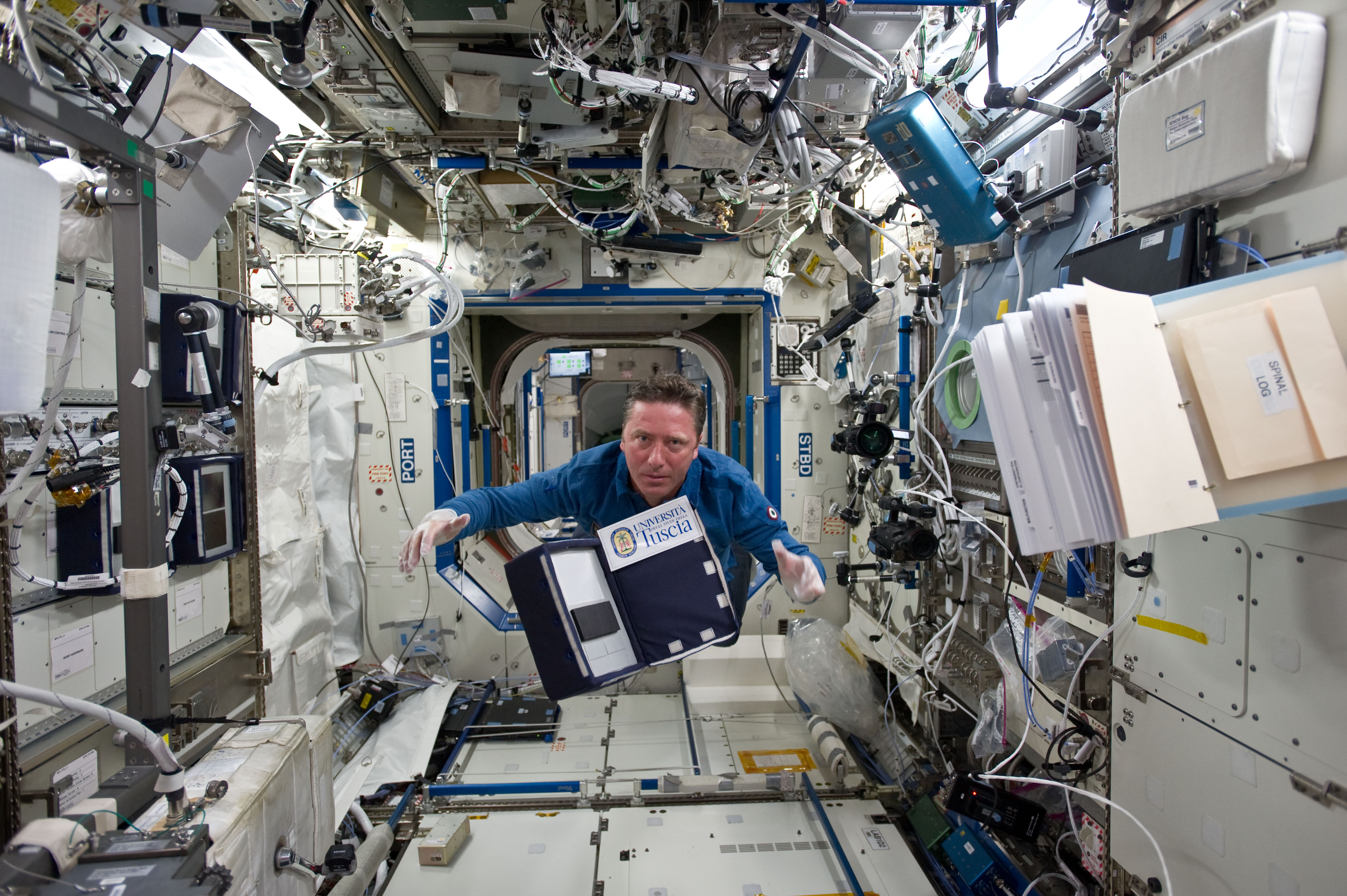
Roberto Vittori floats through the Destiny laboratory.

=== May 20 (Flight Day 5 – EVA 1) ===
The first spacewalk of the STS-134 mission was completed on flight day 5. Drew Feustel and Greg Chamitoff completed the installation of a new set of MISSE experiments, and also started installing a new wireless video system, but were stopped when a CO_{2} sensor failed in Chamitoff's suit. After the failure, the pair were told to install an ammonia jumper between the Port 3 (P3) and Port 6 (P6) truss segments. The spacewalkers furthermore installed a new light on the Crew Equipment Translation Aid (CETA) cart on the Starboard 3 (S3) truss segment, and a cover on the starboard Solar Alpha Rotary Joint (SARJ). The installation of the wireless video system was completed during the third EVA. While the 6-hour-and-19-minute-long spacewalk was in progress, members of the STS-134 crew completed more equipment transfers between Endeavour and the ISS. Expedition 27 crew members also prepared for the departure of Dmitri Kondratyev, Paolo Nespoli and Cady Coleman.

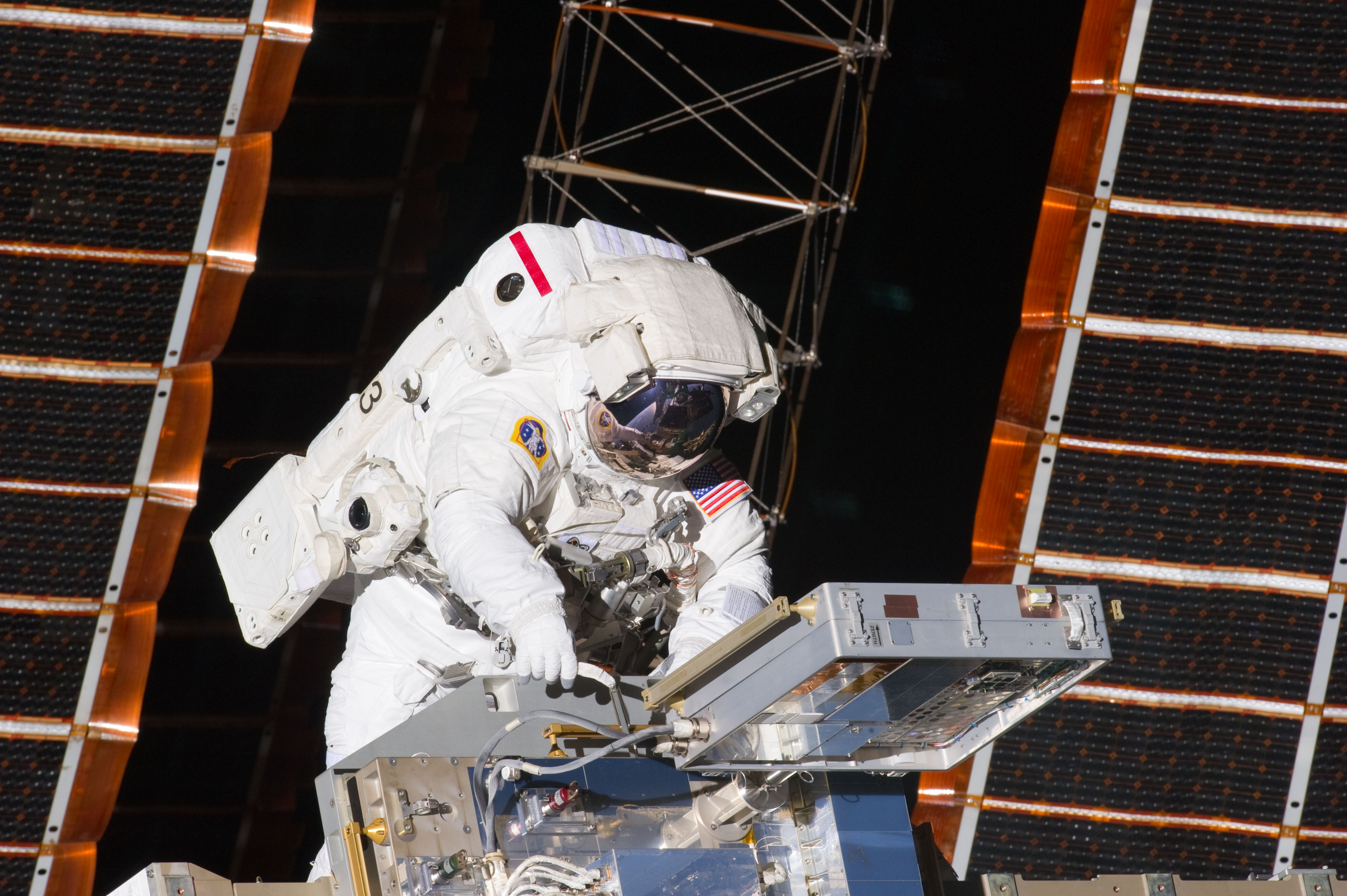
Astronaut Andrew Feustel participates in the mission's first EVA

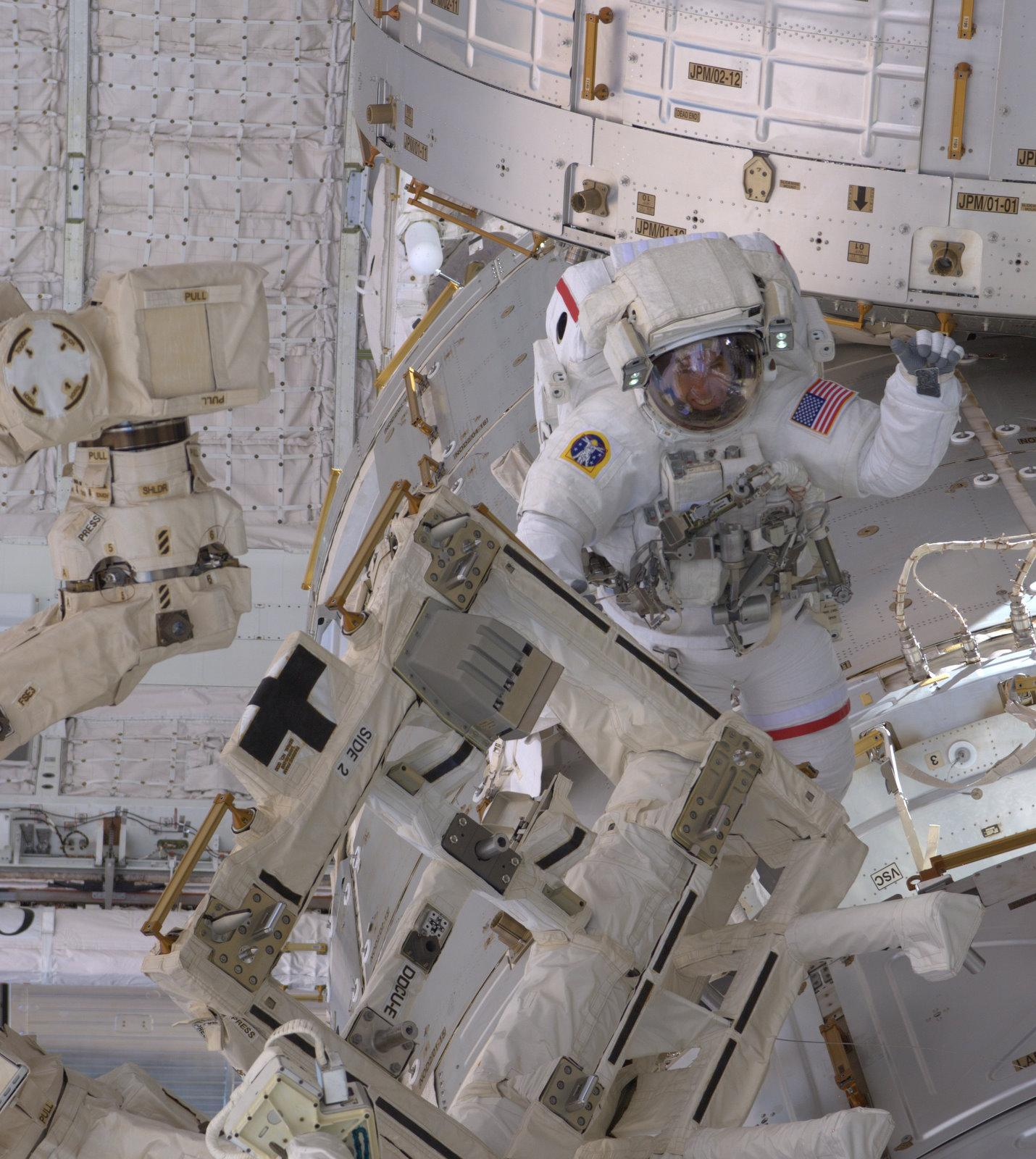
Feustel during EVA 1

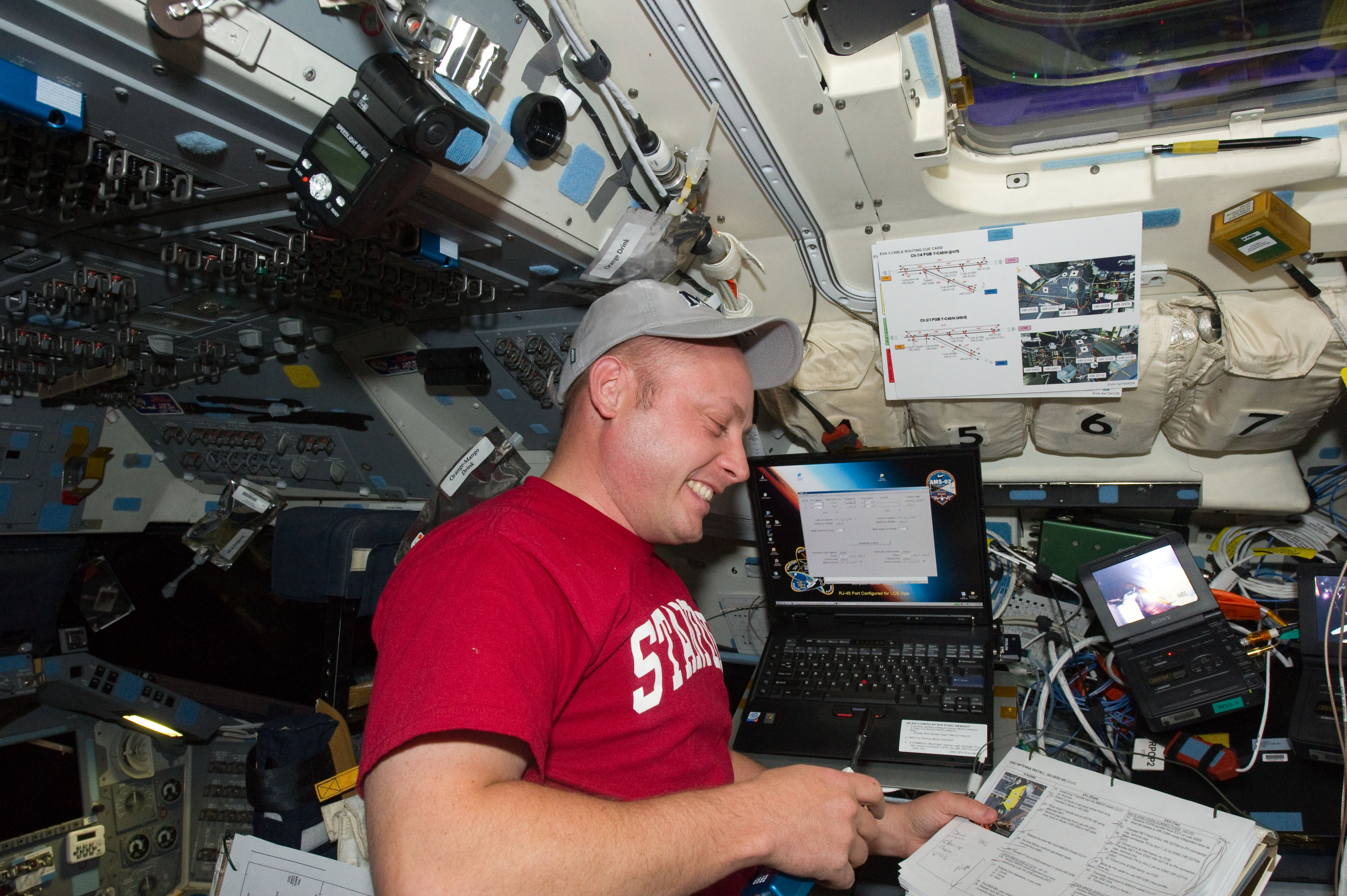
EVA 1 choreographer Michael Fincke works on the aft flight deck of Endeavour

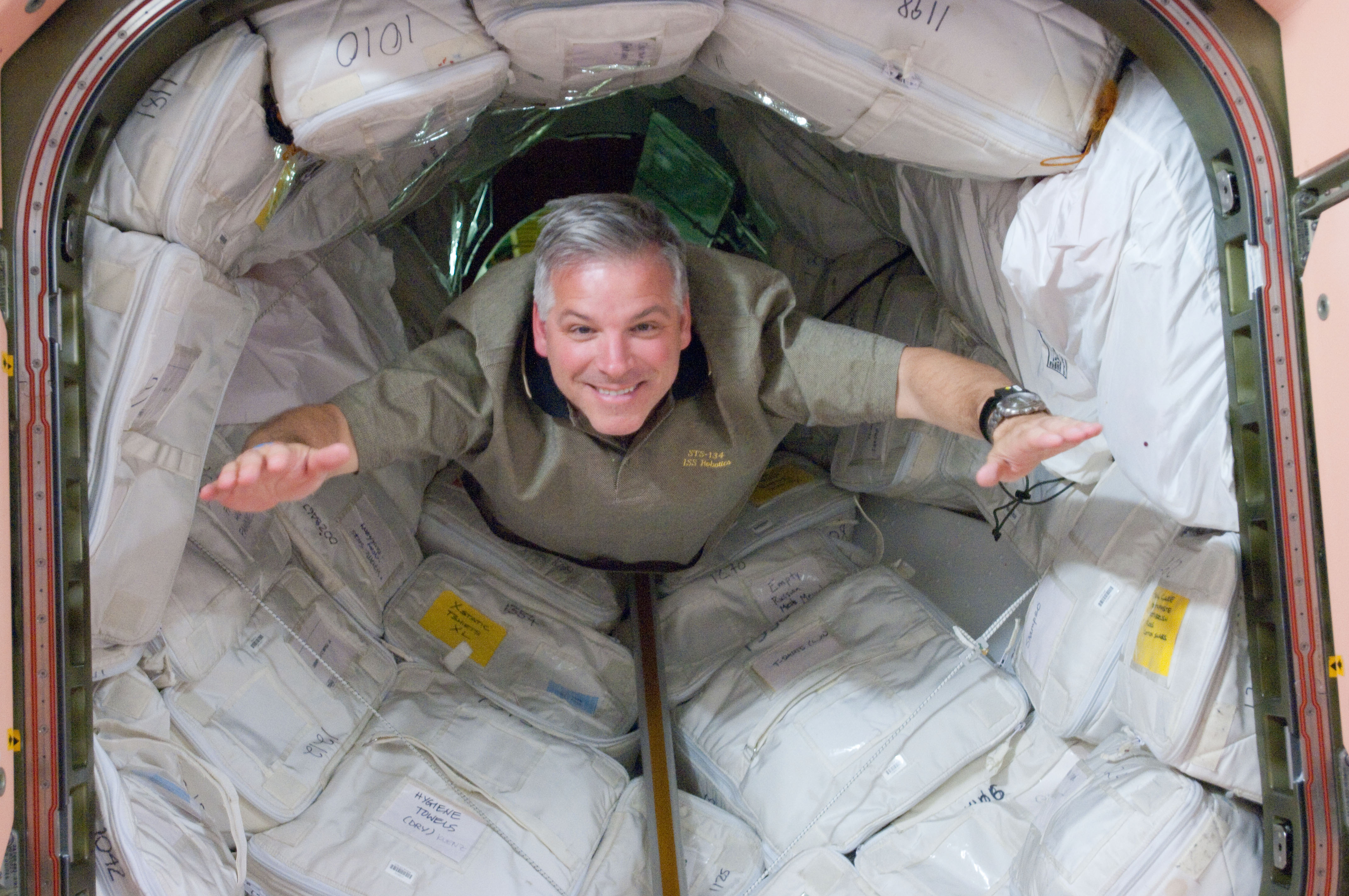
STS-134 pilot Greg Johnson

=== May 21 (Flight Day 6) ===
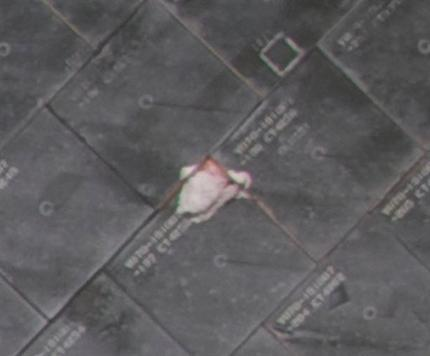
One of Endeavour's damaged thermal protection tiles

On flight day 6, the members of Endeavour's crew performed a focused inspection of an area of thermal protection tiles on the bottom of the orbiter. The tiles were damaged during launch, and detailed data provided by the Orbiter Boom Sensor System (OBSS) was needed to make sure the orbiter could re-enter Earth's atmosphere safely. The focused inspection started with the Canadarm2 grappling the OBSS in the middle of the boom and handing it off to the shuttle's Canadarm, which was controlled by pilot Greg Johnson and mission specialists Mike Fincke and Roberto Vittori. The inspection process took approximately two hours to complete, and resulted in the Thermal Protection System (TPS) being cleared for entry. After the inspection was complete, Fincke joined Drew Feustel to get their spacesuits ready for the second spacewalk of the mission on flight day 7. The pair performed the standard overnight campout procedure to get ready for the EVA. Later in the crew day, the STS-134 crew assembled with the Expedition 27 crew in the Kibo module. The joint crew spoke with Pope Benedict XVI, answering several questions asked by the Pope. This marked the first time a Pope has spoken to astronauts in space. Benedict also blessed Mark Kelly's wife Gabby Giffords, who had undergone skull surgery earlier in the week, and offered condolences to Paolo Nespoli for the loss of his mother.

=== May 22 (Flight Day 7 – EVA 2) ===
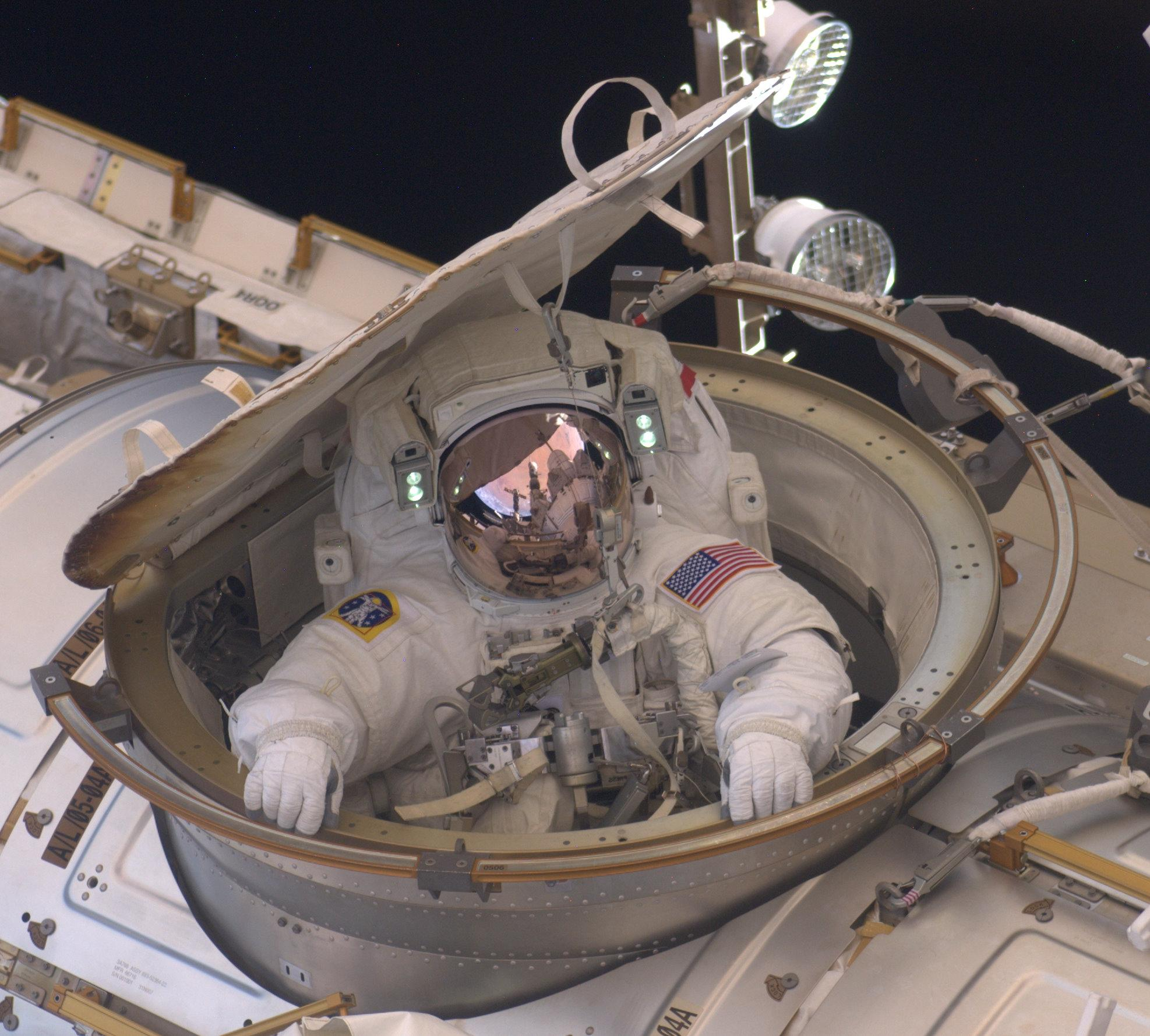
Feustel during EVA 2

The second EVA of STS-134 was conducted on flight day 7 by Drew Feustel and Mike Fincke. The spacewalk, the sixth-longest in the history of spaceflight at the time, lasted 8 hours and 7 minutes, significantly longer than the planned 6 hours and 30 minutes. The excursion also marked the second-longest spacewalk conducted from the ISS. During the spacewalk, Fincke and Feustel hooked up a jumper to transfer 2.3 kg (5 lb) of ammonia to the Port 6 Photovoltaic Thermal Control System (PVTCS), lubricated the Solar Alpha Rotary Joint (SARJ) and one of the "hands" on Dextre, and installed a stowage beam on the Starboard 1 (S1) truss. During the lubrication task on the Port SARJ, some of the bolts on one of the thermal blankets came free, and one was lost. Commander Mark Kelly documented the spacewalk with still and video cameras, while mission specialist Greg Chamitoff assisted Feustel and Fincke. The spacewalk was the seventh for Fincke and the fifth for Feustel. Fincke had conducted his previous six spacewalks in Russian Orlan suits.

While the EVA was conducted, the rest of the STS-134 crew completed more transfers between the ISS and Endeavour. Flight day 7 also saw the ISS' change of command ceremony. Russian cosmonaut Dmitri Kondratyev, who had been the commander of Expedition 27 aboard the station, conducted a ceremonial change of command with cosmonaut Andrei Borisenko, the commander of Expedition 28.

=== May 23 (Flight Day 8) ===
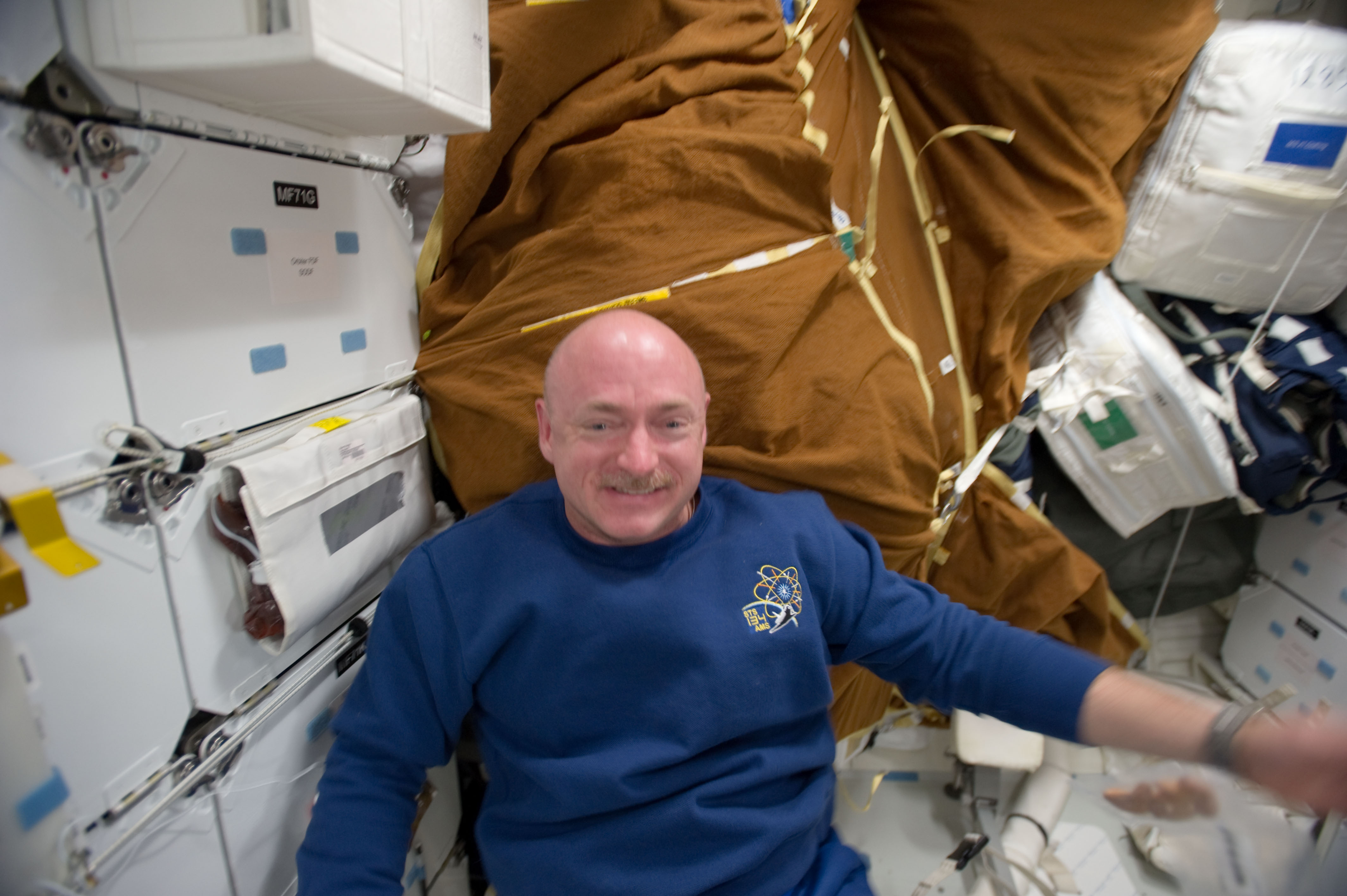
STS-134 commander Mark Kelly in the mid-deck of Endeavour

On flight day 8, the crew of STS-134 had some off duty time. Commander Mark Kelly and mission specialist Mike Fincke conducted an in-flight interview with 400 students from Mesa Verde Elementary School in Tucson, Arizona. Later in the crew day, STS-134 mission specialist Roberto Vittori and Expedition 27 flight engineer Paolo Nespoli answered questions from Italian President Giorgio Napolitano.

After the STS-134 crew went to bed, the Expedition 27 crew prepared for their departure. Expedition 27 commander Dmitri Kondratyev and flight engineers Paolo Nespoli and Catherine Coleman left the ISS aboard the Soyuz TMA-20 spacecraft at 21:35 UTC. The departure of the three Expedition 27 crew members marked the start of Expedition 28, leaving the new expedition commander Andrei Borisenko and flight engineers Aleksandr Samokutyayev and Ron Garan aboard the station. Before re-entry, Soyuz TMA-20 performed a special fly-about of the ISS, taking numerous photographs of the station and of Endeavour. Soyuz TMA-20 and the Expedition 27 crew landed safely in central Kazakhstan at 02:27 UTC on May 24, 2011.

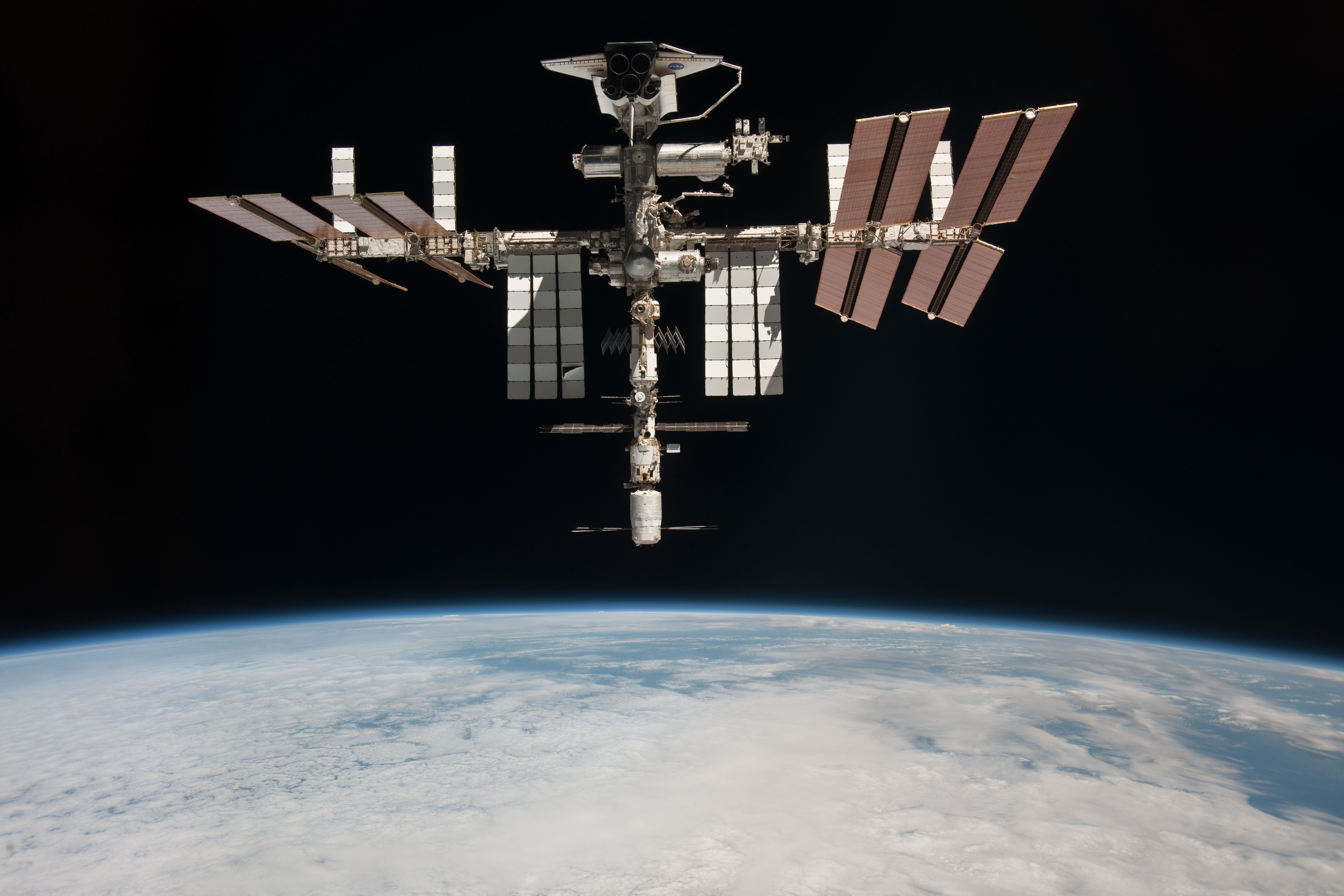
Photo of the ISS and Endeavour taken from Soyuz TMA-20

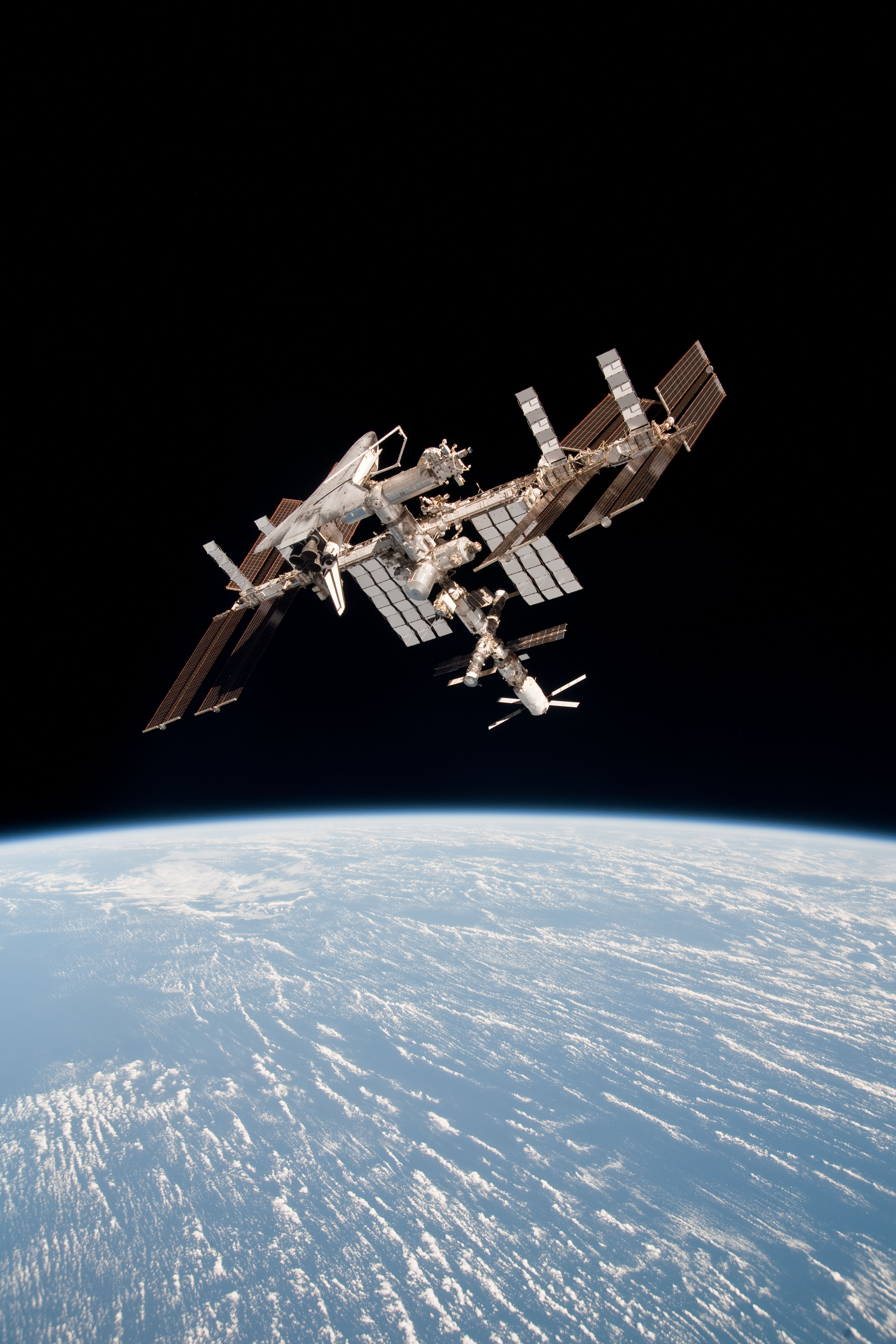
Photo of the ISS and Endeavour taken from Soyuz TMA-20

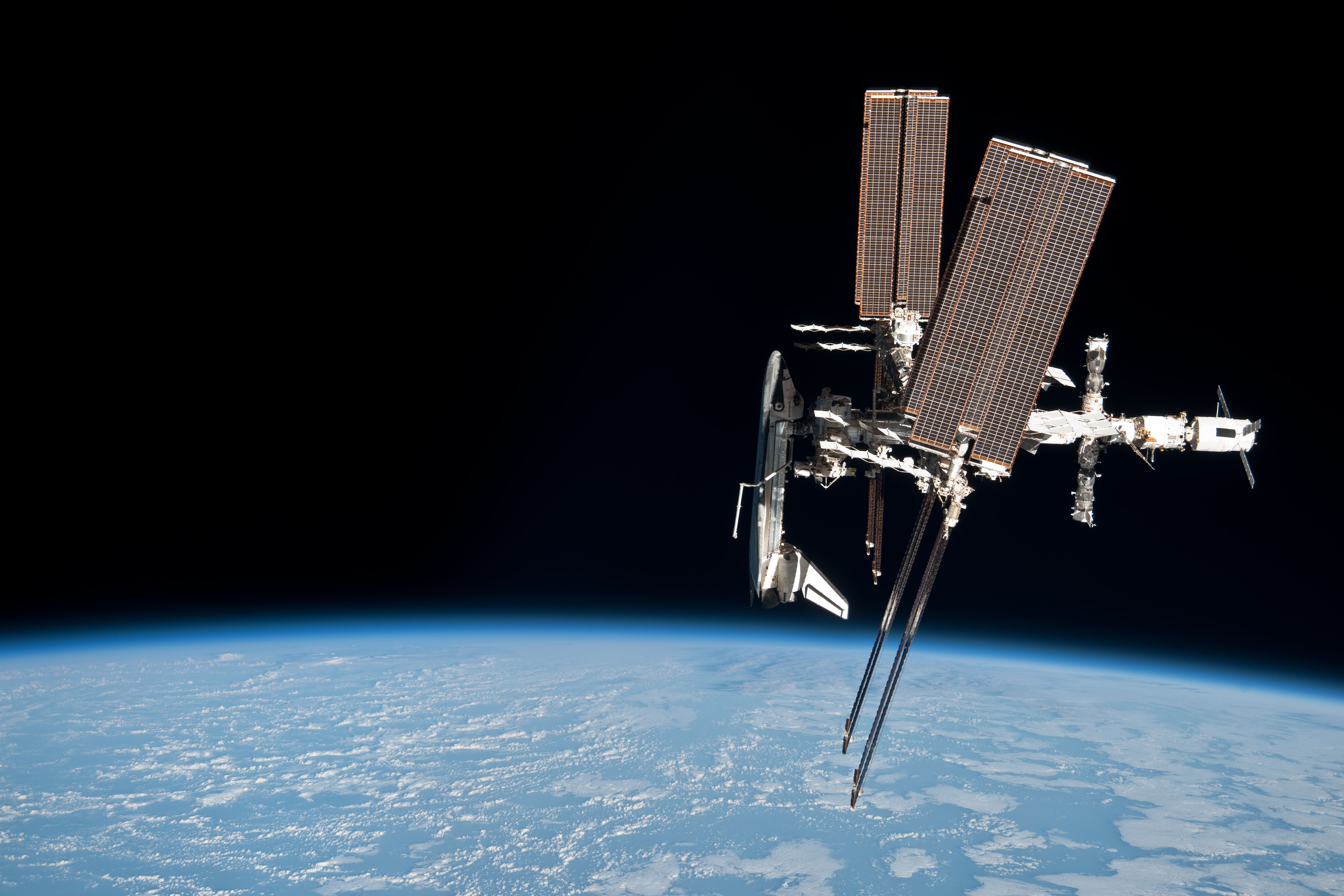
Photo of the ISS and Endeavour taken from Soyuz TMA-20

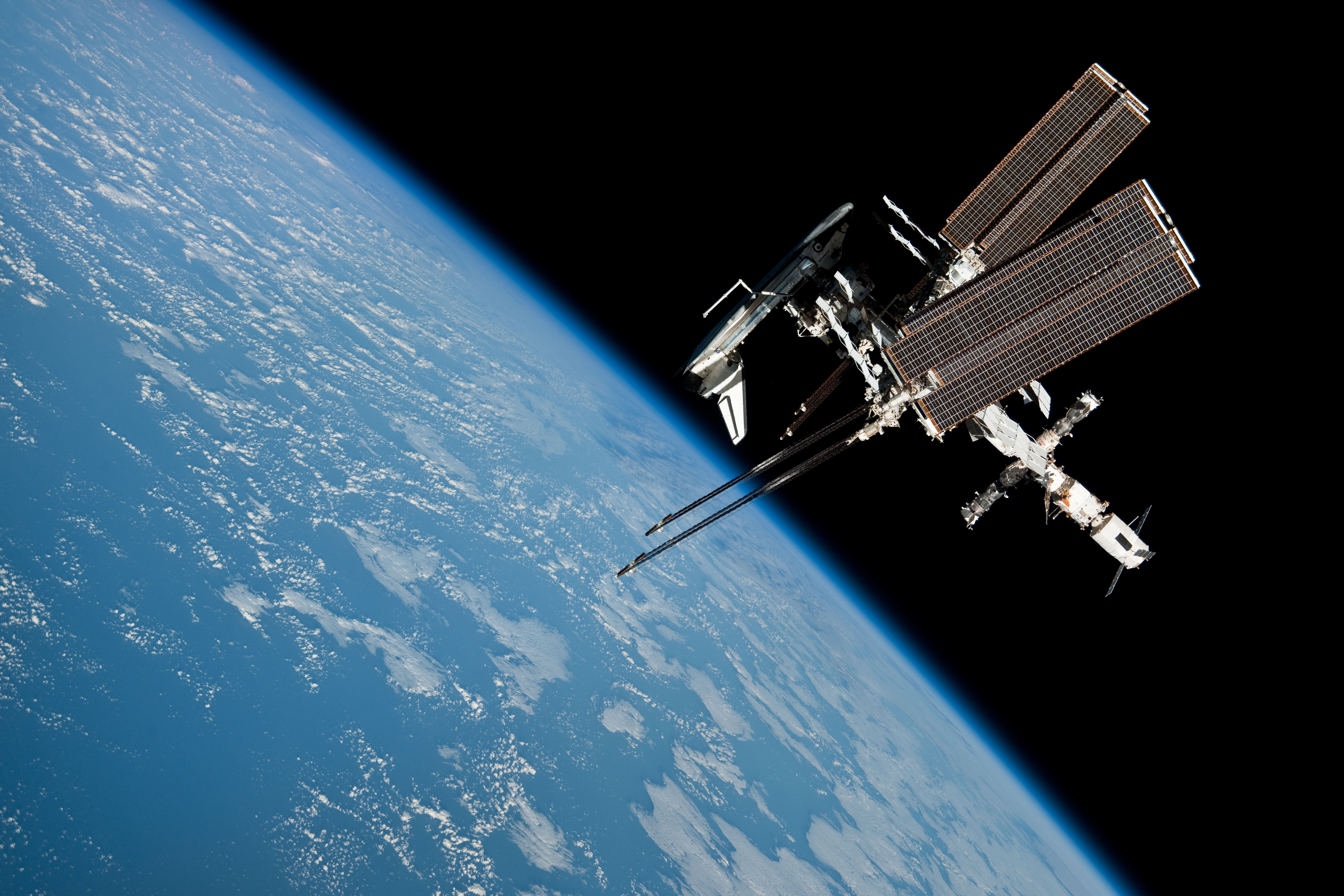
Photo of the ISS and Endeavour taken from Soyuz TMA-20

=== May 24 (Flight Day 9) ===
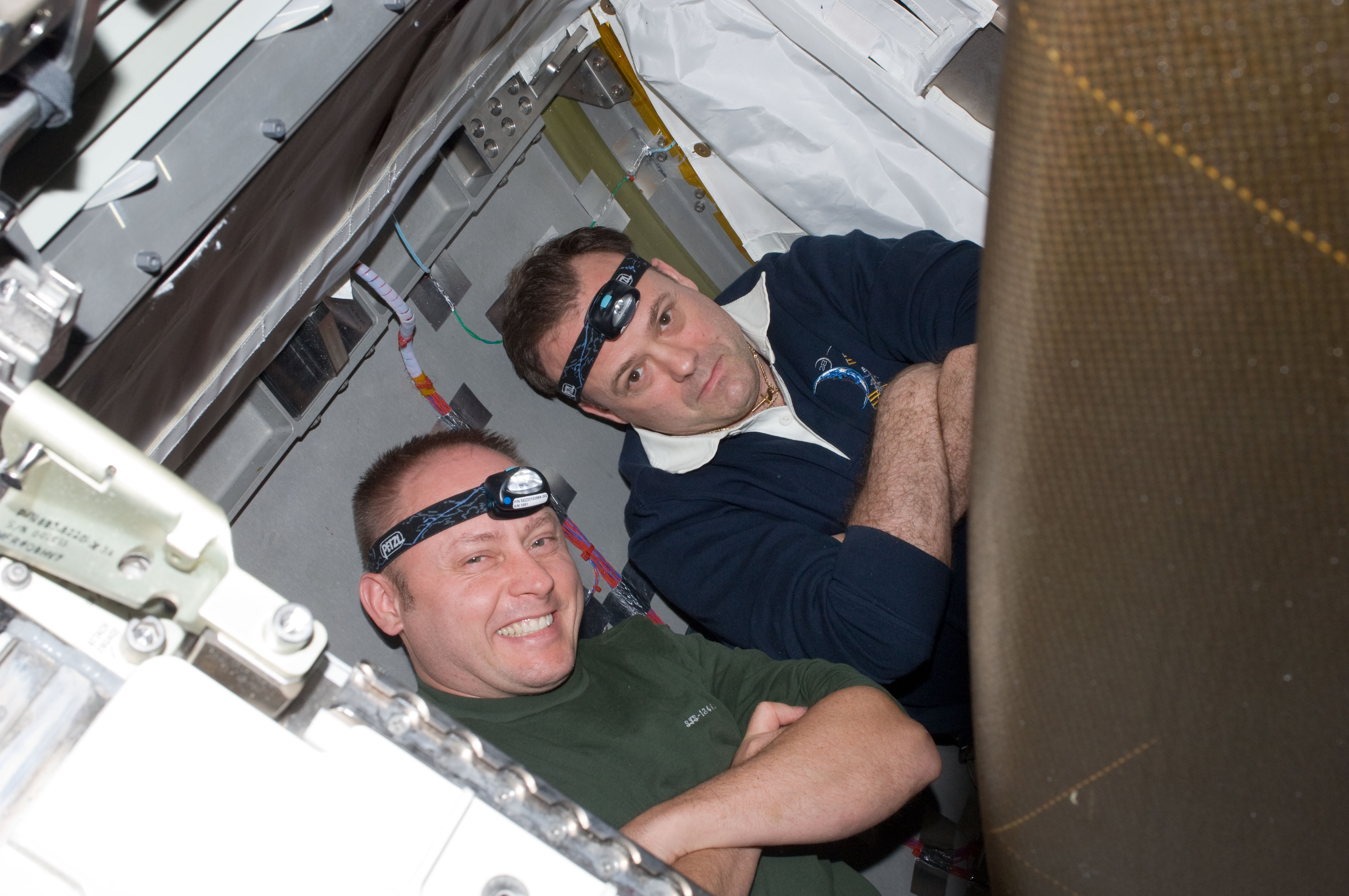
Mike Fincke and Expedition 28 crew member Ron Garan pose for a photo.

On flight day 9, mission specialist Greg Chamitoff and pilot Greg Johnson conducted a series of interviews with media outlets around the United States, including KPIX-TV, KGO-TV and KFBK. Later in the day, commander Mark Kelly and mission specialists Mike Fincke and Chamitoff conducted interviews with The Daily, KDKA, Pittsburgh Tribune-Review and KTRK-TV. Johnson and mission specialist Roberto Vittori also completed some more equipment transfers between the station and shuttle, and began to clean up and organize the Permanent Multipurpose Module (PMM) Leonardo. The STS-134 crew furthermore completed some work on the Oxygen Generator System (OGS) and Carbon Dioxide Removal Assembly (CDRA). Drew Feustel, joined by Fincke and Chamitoff, spent most of the day preparing the tools for the following day's EVA. At the end of their day, the shuttle crew and Expedition 28 flight engineer Ron Garan conducted an EVA procedures review in preparation for the third spacewalk on flight day 10.

=== May 25 (Flight Day 10 – EVA 3) ===
On flight day 10, the third spacewalk of the STS-134 mission was conducted. The spacewalk made use of a new spacewalk pre-breathe protocol, called In-Suit Light Exercise (ISLE), instead of the normal campout pre-breathe protocol. The new pre-breathe protocol had the astronauts breathe pure oxygen for 60 minutes in the airlock, which had its air pressure lowered to 10.2 Psi (703hPa). The astronauts then put their spacesuits on, performed light exercise and rested for an additional 50 minutes, breathing pure oxygen all the while. After astronauts Drew Feustel and Mike Fincke exited the Quest Airlock, the pair began installing the Power Data Grapple Fixture (PDGF). The fixture itself and most of its components were installed, but the data cable associated with it was to be installed later. The spacewalking pair then moved on and routed some new power cables from the Unity module to the Zarya module on the Russian segment of the ISS, providing a redundant power supply to the Russian segment. Feustel and Fincke then moved on to finish up the installation of the wireless video system which Fuestel and Greg Chamitoff had begun to install on EVA 1. The pair also took pictures of the Zarya module's thrusters and captured some infrared video of an experiment delivered on board the Express Logistics Carrier (ELC) 3. Commander Mark Kelly documented the spacewalk from inside the station. While the EVA was going on, pilot Greg Johnson and mission specialist Roberto Vittori assisted Expedition 28 flight engineer Ron Garan in stowing new equipment and supplies on the ISS.

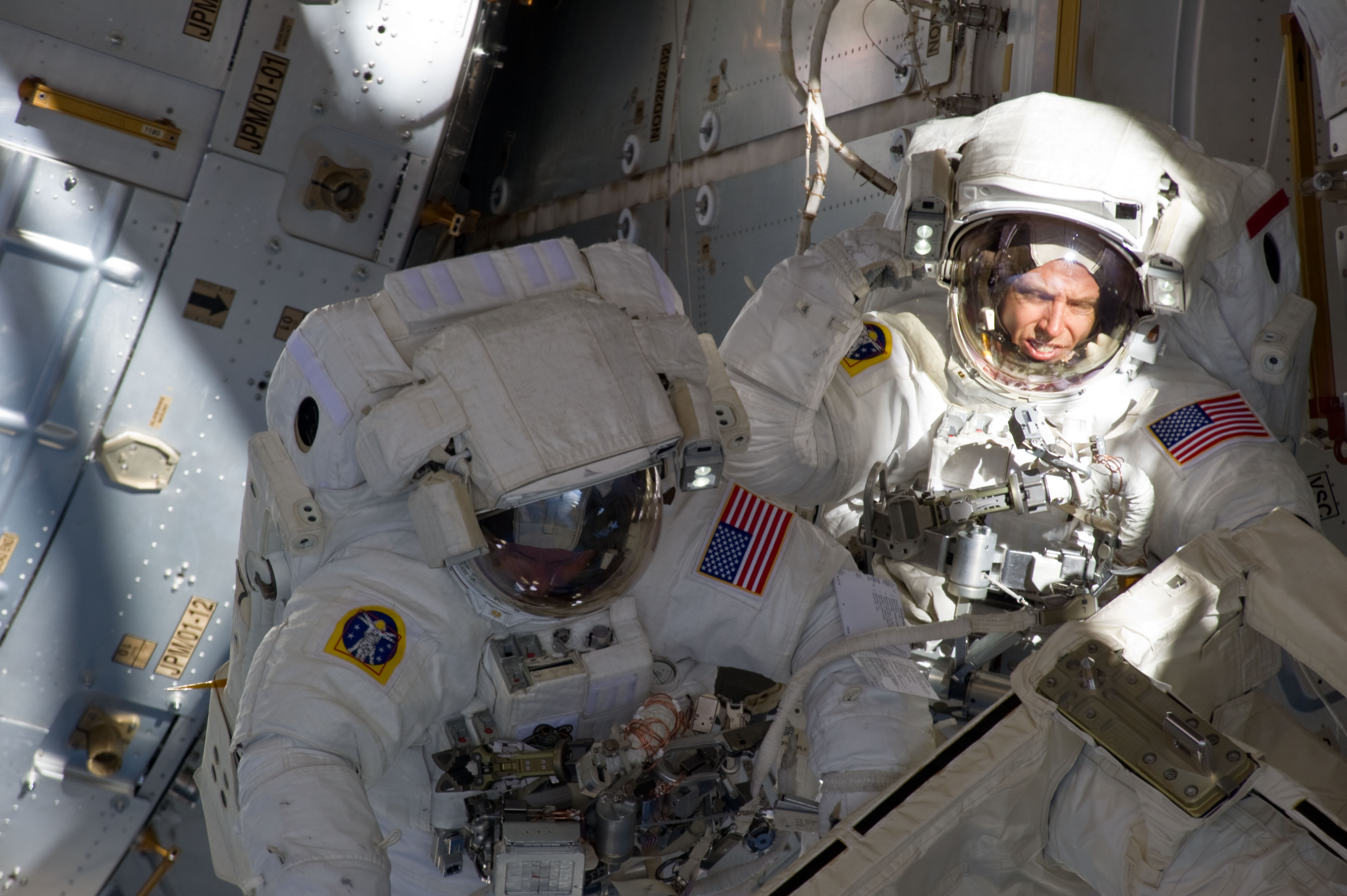
Feustel (right) and Fincke work during EVA 3

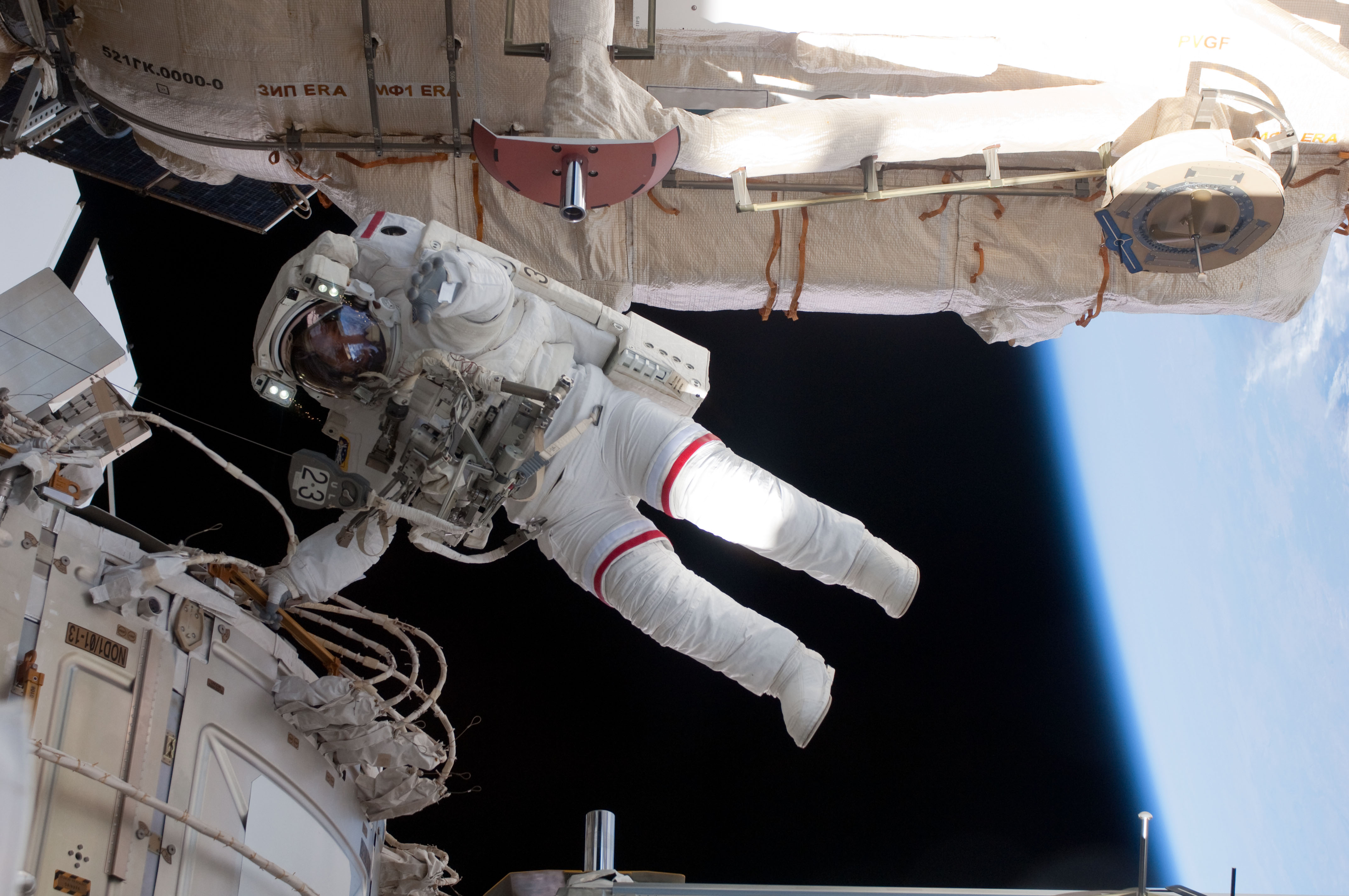
Drew Feustel during EVA 3

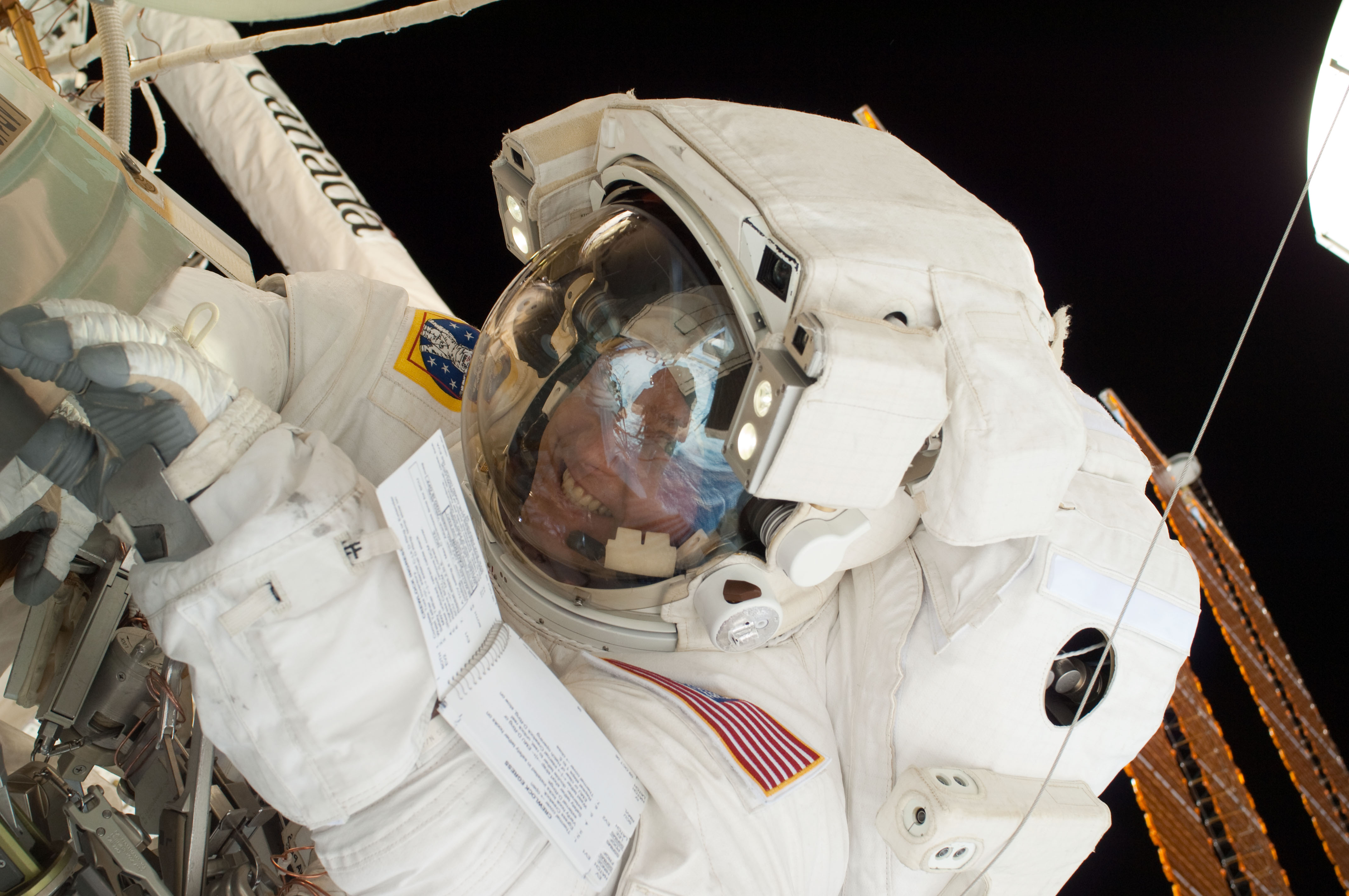
Mike Fincke during EVA 3

=== May 26 (Flight Day 11) ===
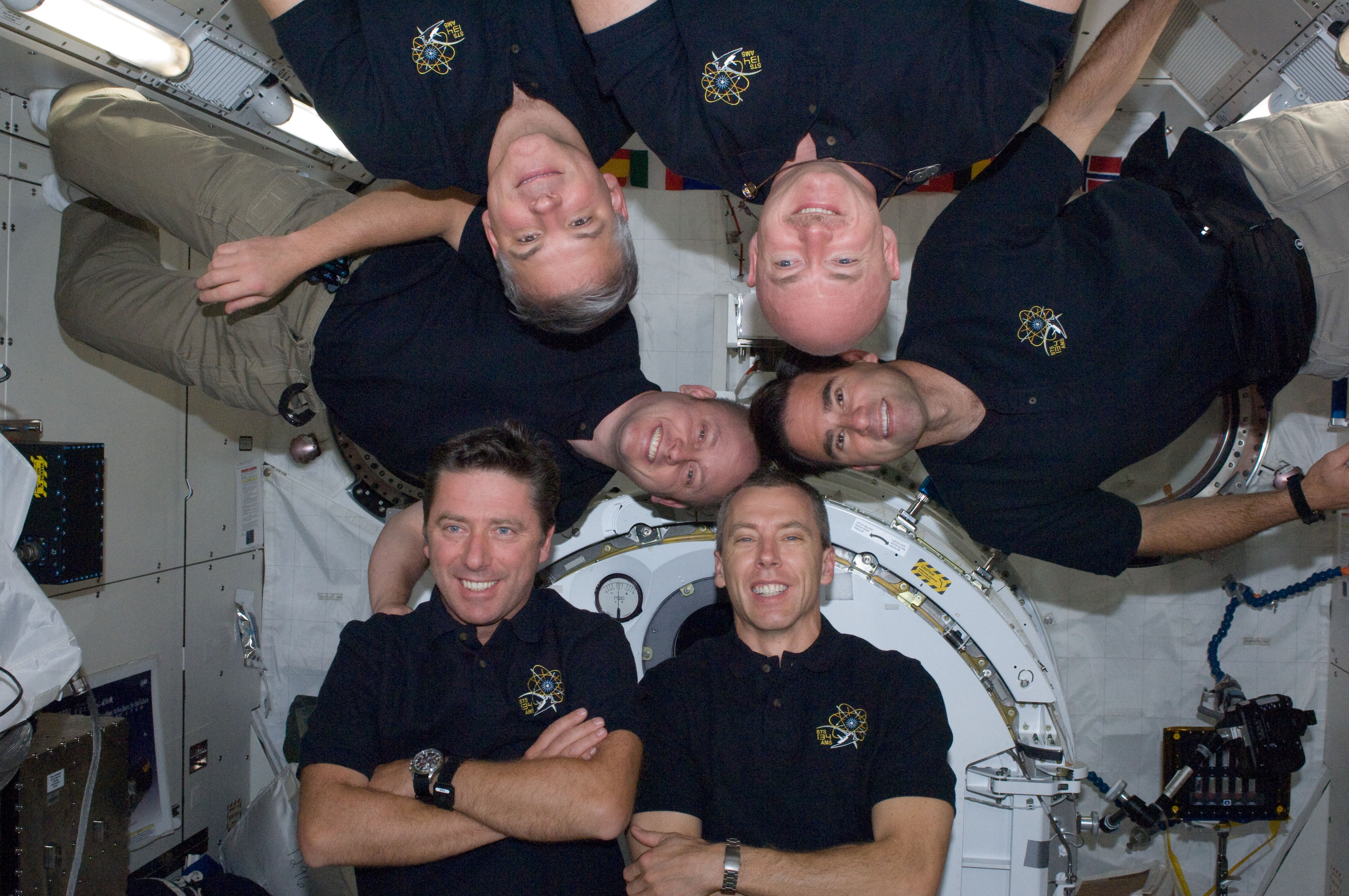
In-flight STS-134 crew portrait in the Kibo Lab

On flight day 11, the crew of Space Shuttle Endeavour conducted a late inspection of the orbiter's Thermal Protection System. On most previous flights, this inspection was performed after the shuttle undocked from the ISS. However, in this case it was done early, because the Orbiter Boom Sensor System (OBSS) was to be left on board the ISS after Endeavour's departure. The joint Expedition 28/STS-134 crew held a news conference with reporters on the ground at NASA centers around the country and ISS partner agencies. Commander Mark Kelly also spoke to reporters from four Tucson, Arizona television stations. Later in the crew day, the joint crew held an EVA procedure review for the fourth and final spacewalk of STS-134. Astronauts Mike Fincke and Greg Chamitoff spent the night in the Quest Airlock with the air pressure reduced to 10.2 Psi, so as to avoid decompression sickness during their spacewalk. The crew and flight controllers on the ground opted not to use the In-suit Light Exercise (ISLE) protocol that was tested during EVA 3 earlier in the mission, opting instead to go with the standard campout protocol, since it was discovered that ISLE used more carbon-dioxide scrubbing capability. They wanted to save this capability, since a CO_{2} sensor in Chamitoff's suit had failed during EVA 1, cutting that spacewalk short.

=== May 27 (Flight Day 12 – EVA 4) ===
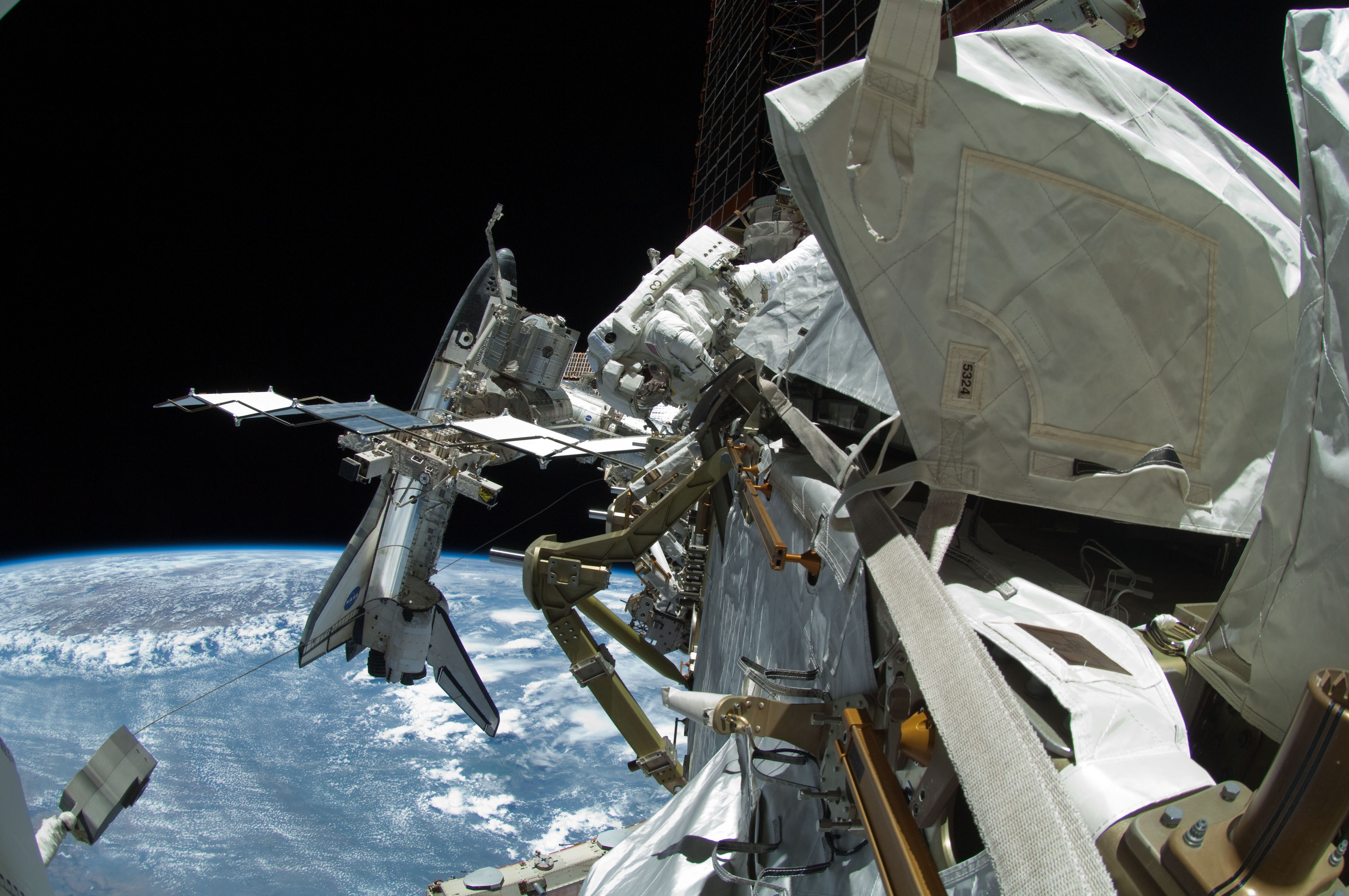
Endeavour docked at the ISS

The final spacewalk of the STS-134 mission, and the final spacewalk of the Space Shuttle program, was carried out on flight day 12. The EVA was conducted by Mike Fincke and Greg Chamitoff, who began the EVA by installing the Orbiter Boom Sensor System (OBSS) on the Starboard 1 (S1) truss segment. After the OBSS was installed, Fincke and Chamitoff removed the End Effector Grapple Fixture (EFGF) and replaced it with a spare Power and Data Grapple Fixture (PDGF). The station's Canadarm2 could not grapple the EFGF, so the PDGF was installed on the end. After that task was completed, Fincke and Chamitoff moved to the Express Logistics Carrier (ELC) 3, and released some torque on the bolts that were holding the spare arm for Dextre down against the ELC. The EVA saw the total cumulative time spent performing EVAs in support of the ISS pass the 1,000-hour mark. The three STS-134 spacewalkers spent a total time of 28 hours and 44 minutes outside the ISS on this mission. Commander Mark Kelly assisted with documenting the spacewalk by taking photos and video. In the meantime, the rest of the shuttle crew completed more equipment transfers from Endeavour and the Johannes Kepler ATV to the ISS.

Working from the mid-deck of Endeavour, Andrew Feustel, who participated in the first three spacewalks of the mission, was the EVA 4 choreographer. Astronaut Steven Swanson was the spacewalk CAPCOM from the station flight control room in Houston. During Flight Day 12, Mike Fincke achieved a milestone, becoming the U.S. astronaut with the most time in space, more than 377 days. He surpassed the time in space of astronaut Peggy Whitson.

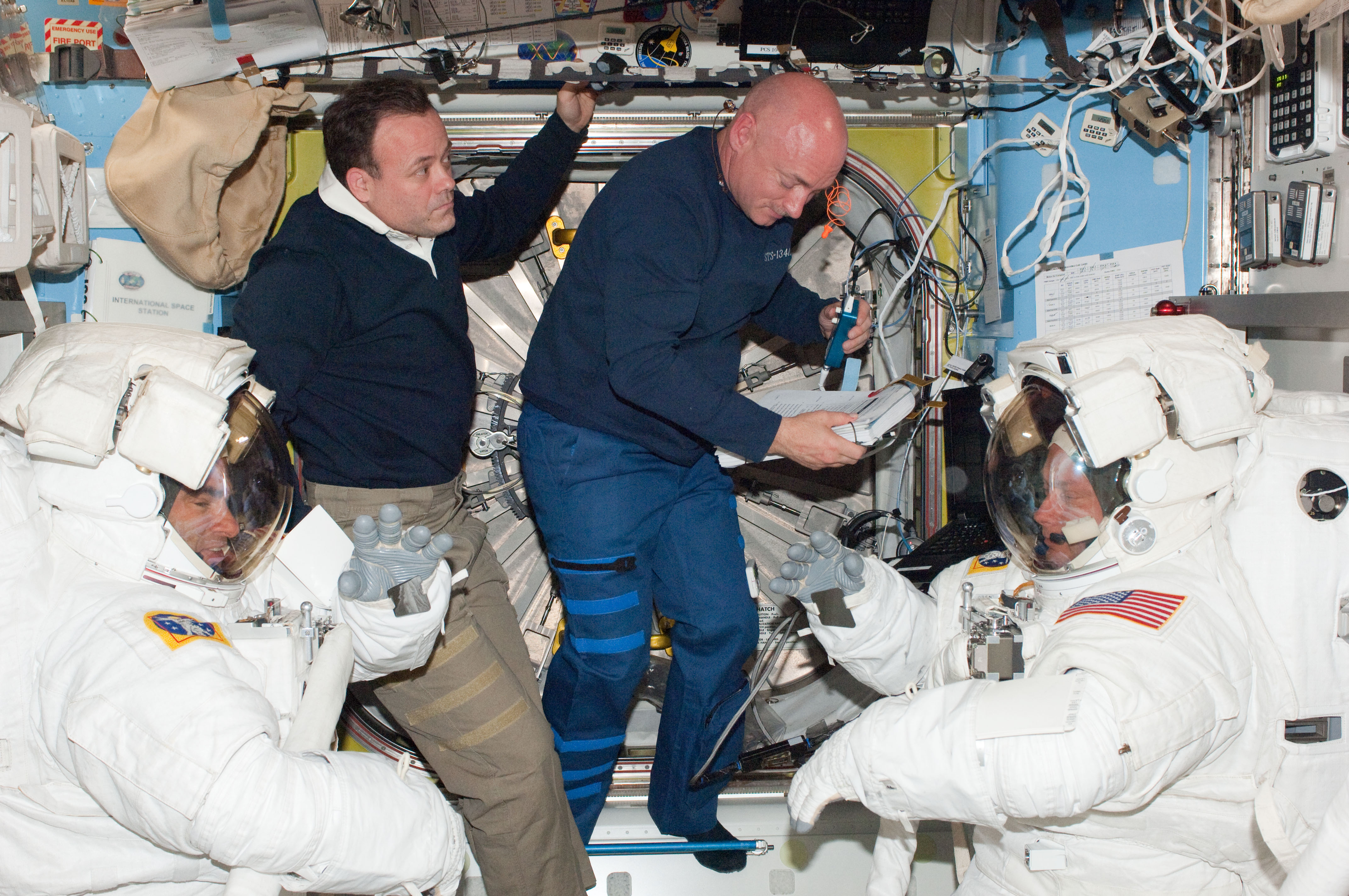
EVA 4 preparations in the Quest Airlock

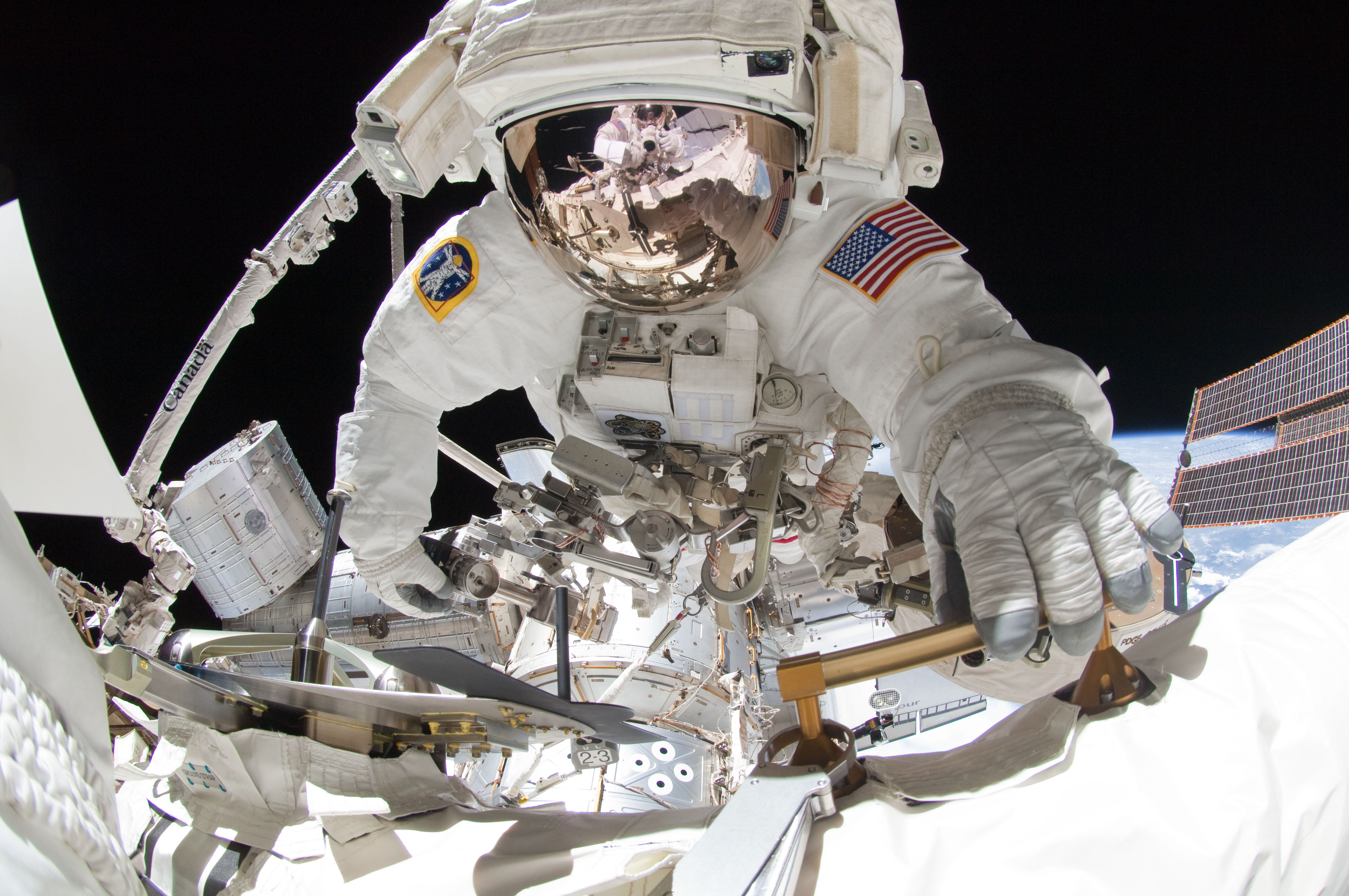
Gregory Chamitoff during EVA 4

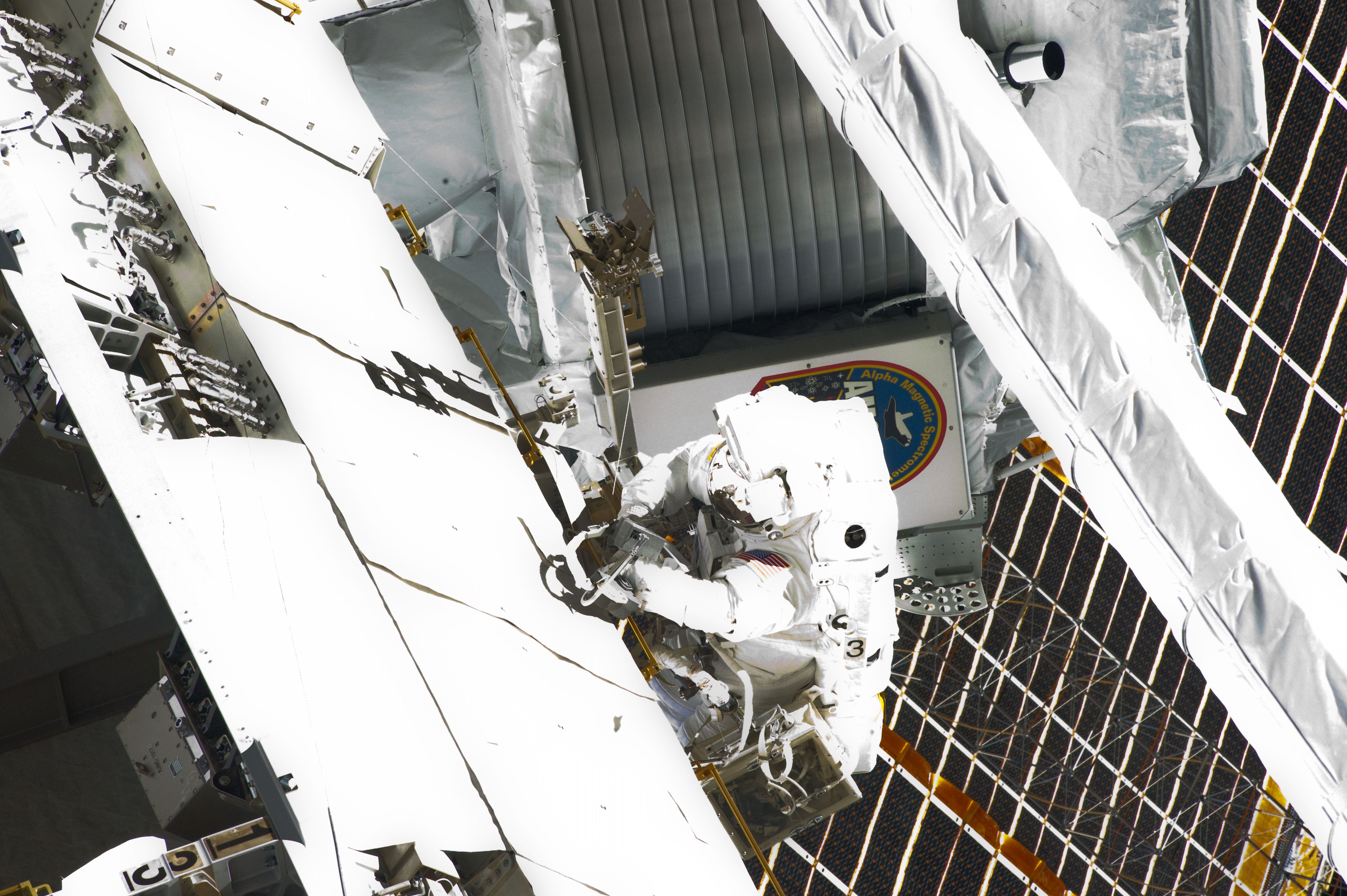
Fincke works outside the ISS during EVA 4

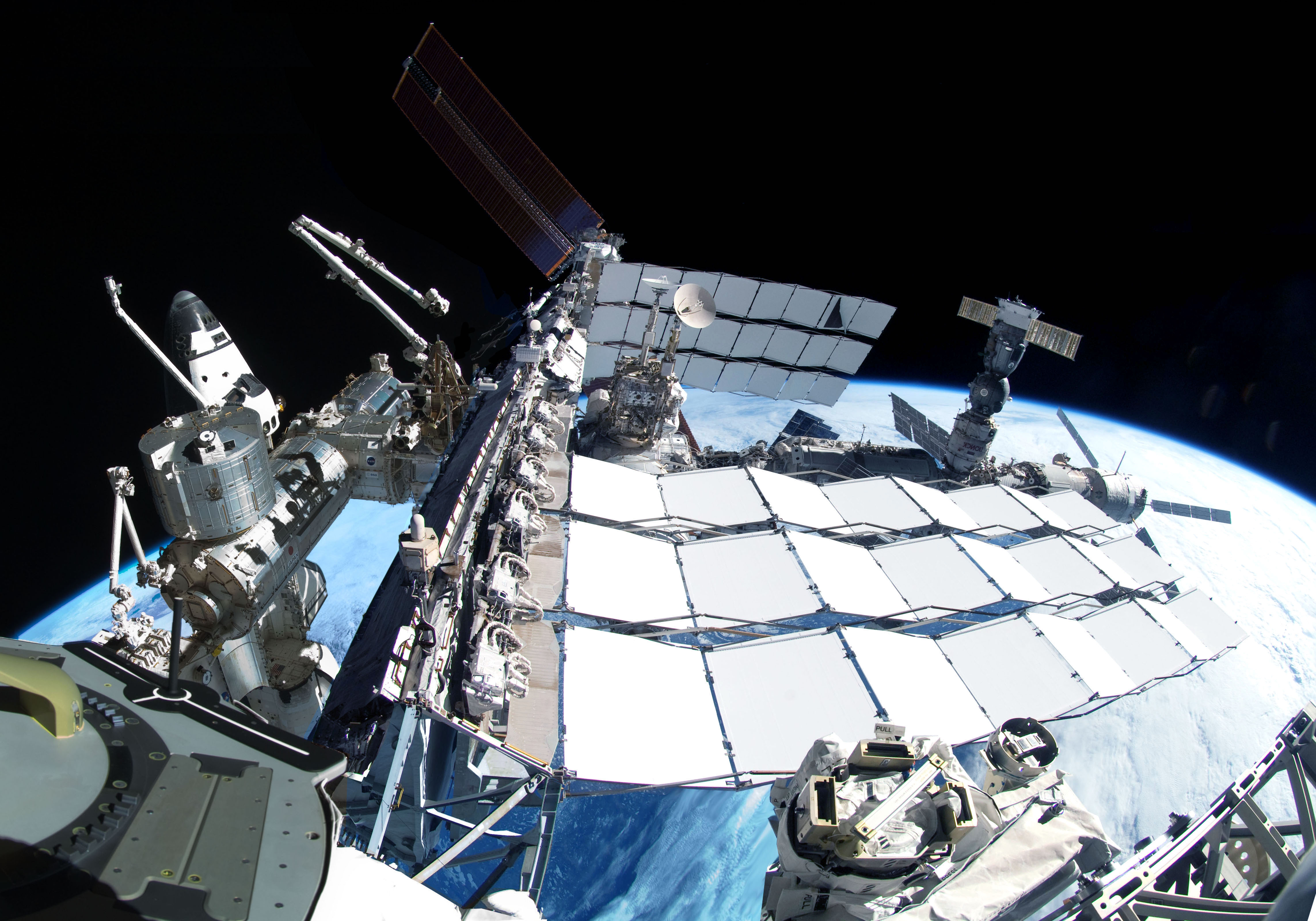
Composite of images showing the view of the entire ISS as seen from ELC-3 during EVA 4

=== May 28 (Flight Day 13) ===
Flight day 13 saw the members of the STS-134 crew complete several major tasks. Mission specialists Mike Fincke and Greg Chamitoff replaced an absorbent bed in the Carbon Dioxide Removal Assembly (CDRA). The beds have to be changed from time to time in order for the CDRA to remove CO_{2}. While the CDRA work was on-going, commander Mark Kelly and mission specialist Drew Feustel re-sized two of the spacesuits that will be used by Expedition 28 flight engineers Ron Garan and Mike Fossum. The rest of the STS-134 crew completed more transfers between Space Shuttle Endeavour and the International Space Station (ISS). Commander Mark Kelly, joined by pilot Greg Johnson and Ron Garan, spoke with students, teachers and others gathered at University of Arizona in Tucson, Arizona. Johnson also spoke with representatives of Gannet, KPRC-TV and the Voice of America.

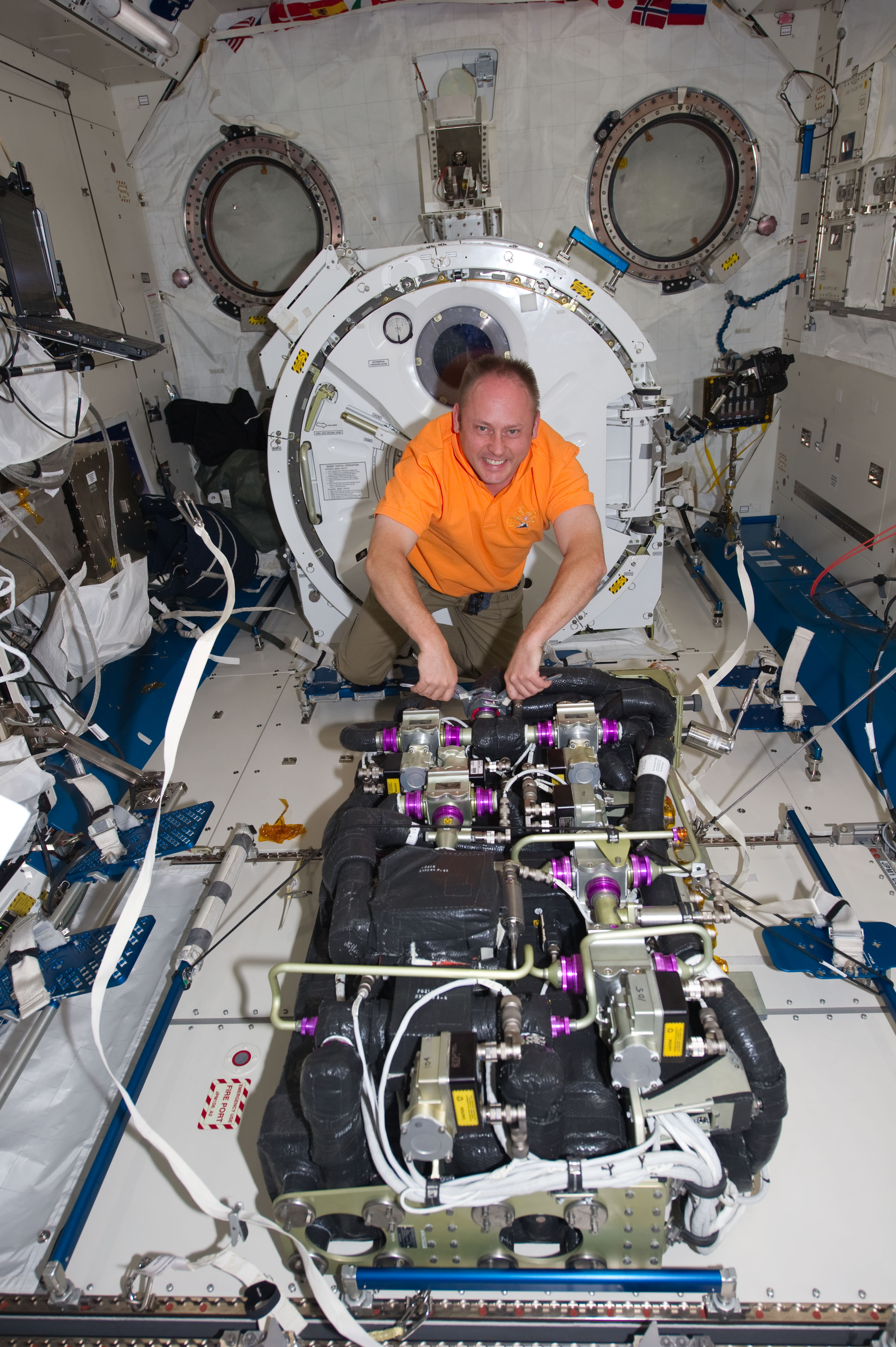
Fincke performs CDRA maintenance work in the Kibo laboratory

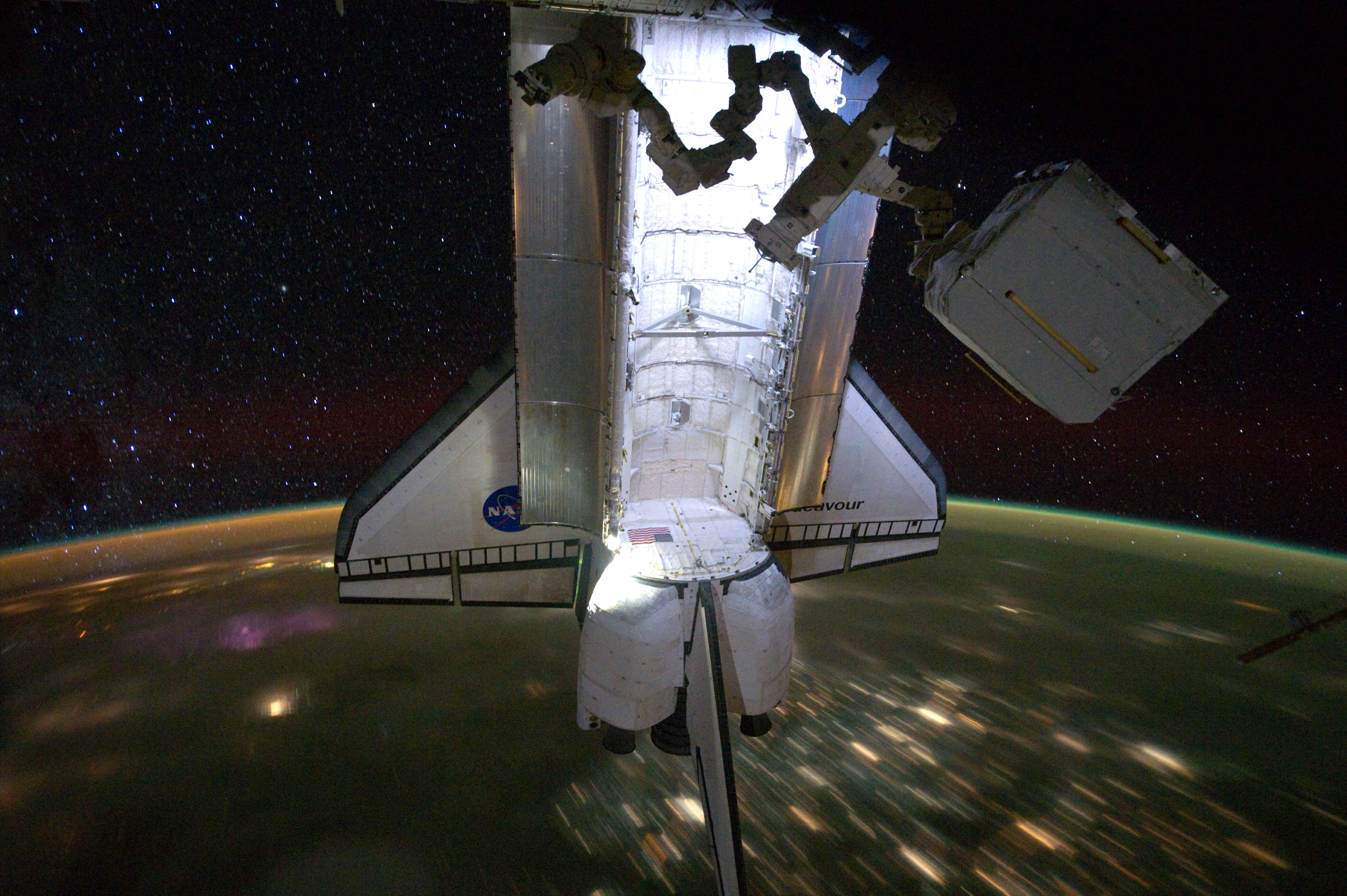
Endeavour, backdropped by a night time view of Earth and a starry sky

=== May 29 (Flight Day 14) ===
Flight day 14 was the final day for the STS-134 crew to complete activities on board the ISS. Pilot Greg Johnson joined Feustel early in the crew day and spoke with WJRT-TV in Flint, Michigan, WJBK-TV in Detroit, Michigan, WKYC-TV in Cleveland, Ohio and WXMI-TV in Grand Rapids, Michigan. The transfer of supplies and equipment was completed on flight day 14, with the transfer of four bags of water from the shuttle to the ISS. Mission specialist Mike Fincke completed the work on the Carbon Dioxide Removal Assembly (CDRA) that he and Greg Chamitoff had started the day before. Chamitoff was joined by Drew Feustel to finish stowing tools that had been used during the mission's four spacewalks. Space shuttle Endeavour's small vernier thrusters were used to raise the ISS by about 960 metres (3,150 ft). The later part of the crew day saw the Expedition 28 crew hold a farewell ceremony for the STS-134 crew. After the two crews said their farewells to one another, they got into procedures to close the hatches on the ISS and Space Shuttle. After the hatches were closed and secured, a series of leak checks were performed on both vehicles, and the Pressurized Mating Adapter 2 (PMA 2) was depressurized. The hatch closures marked the end of joint operations which totaled 10 days, 23 hours and 45 minutes.

=== May 30 (Flight Day 15 – Undocking) ===
On flight day 15, Space Shuttle Endeavour undocked from the International Space Station. Endeavour had been docked with the ISS for 11 days, 17 hours and 41 minutes. After the shuttle undocked, pilot Greg Johnson backed Endeavour out to a distance of 140 m (450 ft) to 200 m (650 ft). Once the shuttle was at the correct distance, Johnson flew a complete lap around the ISS. After the lap was complete, an initial separation burn was completed. After the burn was complete, commander Mark Kelly took over control of the shuttle. Kelly first moved the shuttle to a point 6,100 m (20,000 ft) behind and above the station, then to a point below the ISS. Kelly then guided Endeavour to a point 290 m (950 ft) below the ISS. This series of maneuvers was done to test the Sensor Test for Orion Relative Navigation Risk Mitigation (STORRM) sensors. For the rest of the day, the STS-134 crew conducted preparations for their reentry and landing.

=== May 31 (Flight Day 16) ===
On flight day 16, the members of Space Shuttle Endeavour's STS-134 crew continued preparations for the shuttle's landing on flight day 17. Commander Mark Kelly, pilot Greg Johnson and mission specialist and flight engineer Roberto Vittori performed a checkout of Endeavour's Flight Control Systems (FCS). They began by starting Auxiliary Power Unit 1 (APU 1), so they could test the flight systems such as the ailerons and rudder. The APU was used to provide hydraulic pressure to power the flight control systems. The astronauts next moved on to a test of the Reaction Control System (RCS) jets. This test saw Kelly, Johnson and Vittori fire each jet once. Meanwhile, Drew Feustel, Mike Fincke and Greg Chamitoff stowed items on the mid-deck for their return to Earth. Later in the crew day, they stowed the K_{u} band antenna for re-entry. The crew also performed several experiments, including an eye exam and the Ram Burn Observation (RAMBO2) experiments, and conducted a deorbit briefing to go over the procedures for the landing. The entire crew furthermore participated in in-flight interviews with ABC News, CBS News, CNN, NBC News and Fox News Radio, and sent a crew tribute to Endeavour down to the ground.

=== June 1 (Flight Day 17 – Re-entry and landing) ===
The crew was awakened by mission control at 17:57 Eastern Daylight Time (EDT) to begin flight day 17 to the song "Sunrise No. 1" by Stormy Mondays. The payload bay doors on the shuttle were closed at 22:48 EDT. At 01:29 EDT on June 1, the de-orbit burn was initiated, finishing at 01:31 EDT. The shuttle began reentering the atmosphere at approximately 02:03 EDT. At 02:25 EDT, Endeavour crossed the Florida coast. The shuttle landed safely in Florida at around 02:35 EDT, completing its 25th and final mission into space.

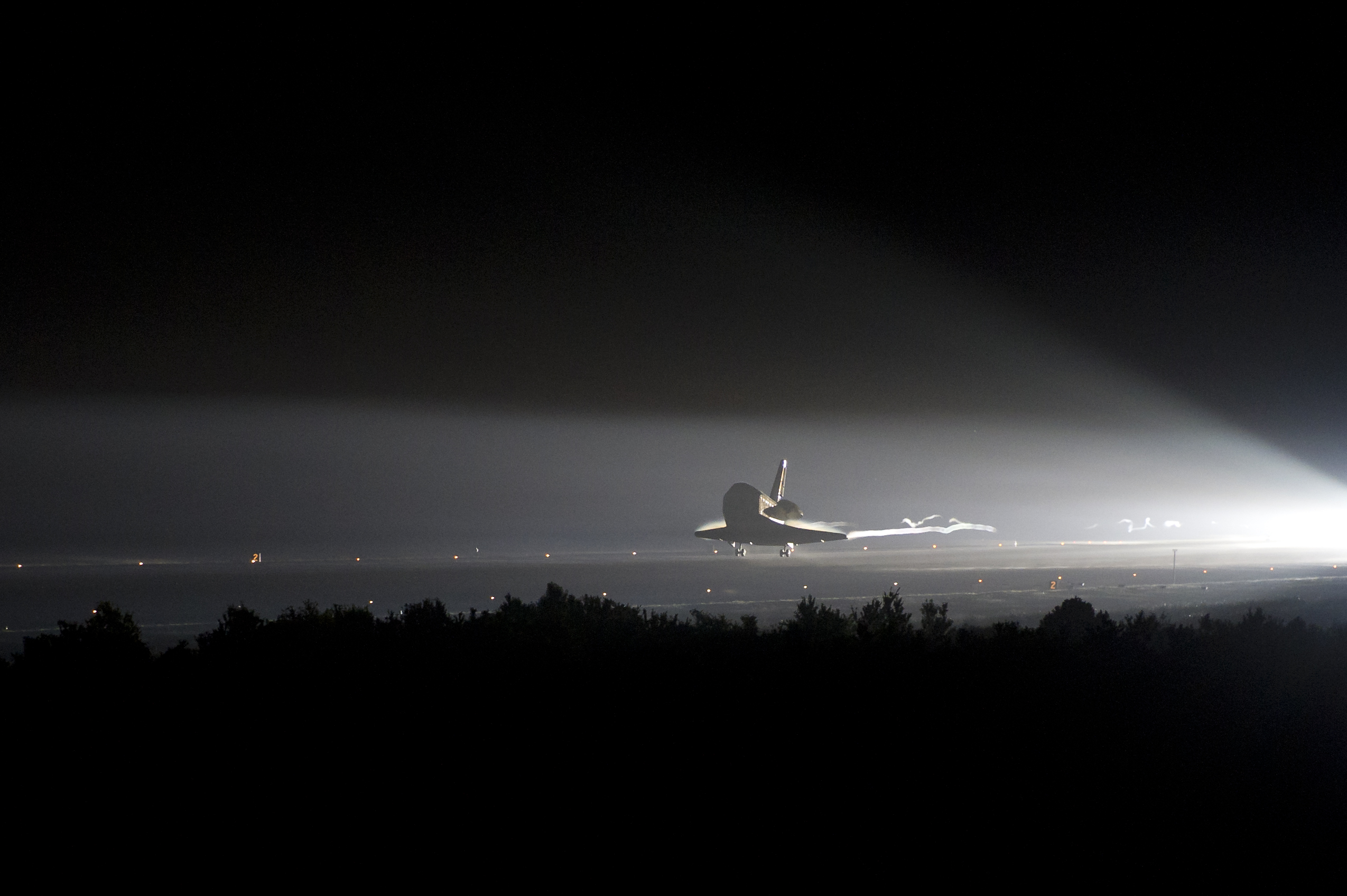
Endeavour touches down at the Kennedy Space Center on 1 June 2011.

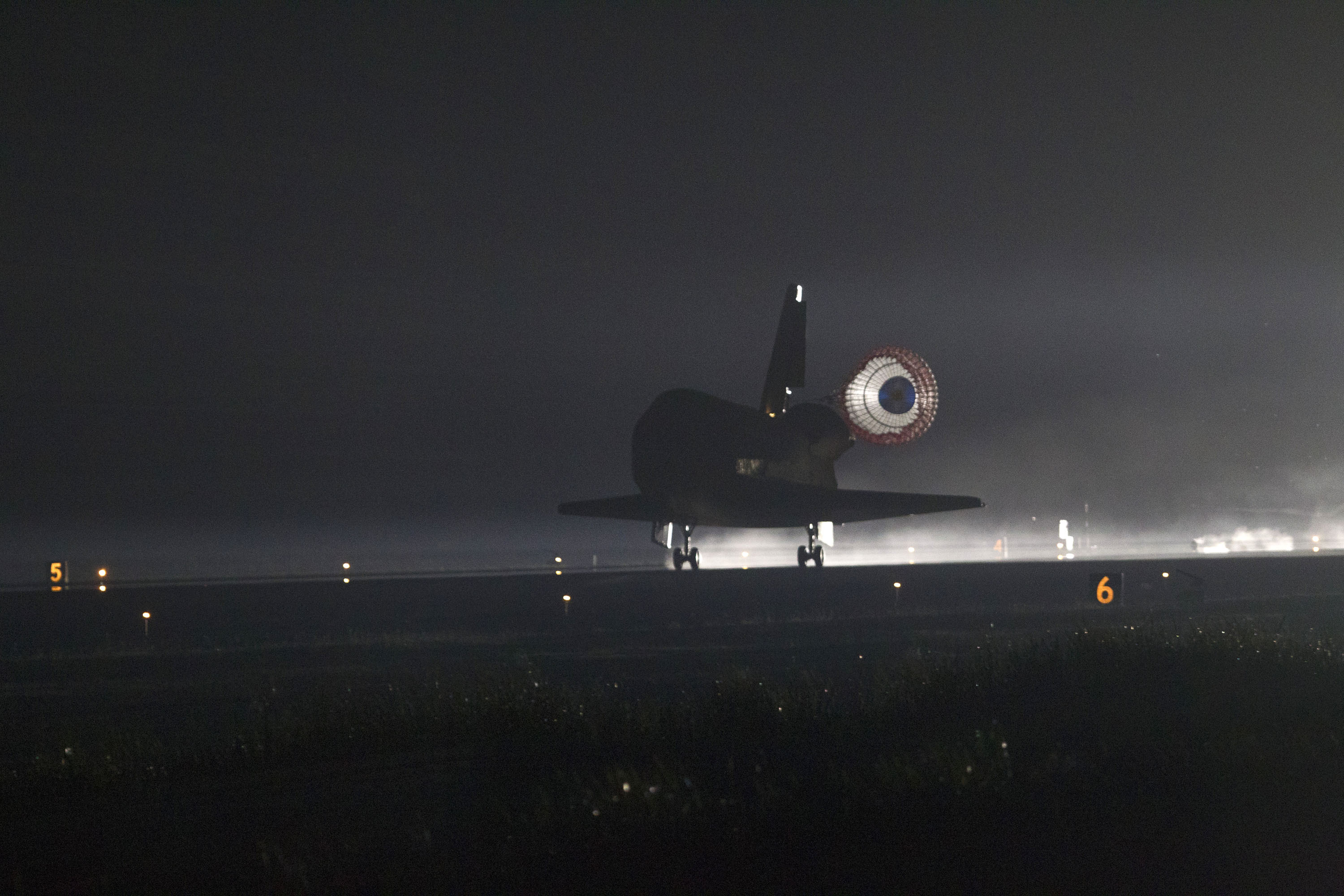
Endeavour shortly after touchdown at Kennedy Space Center.

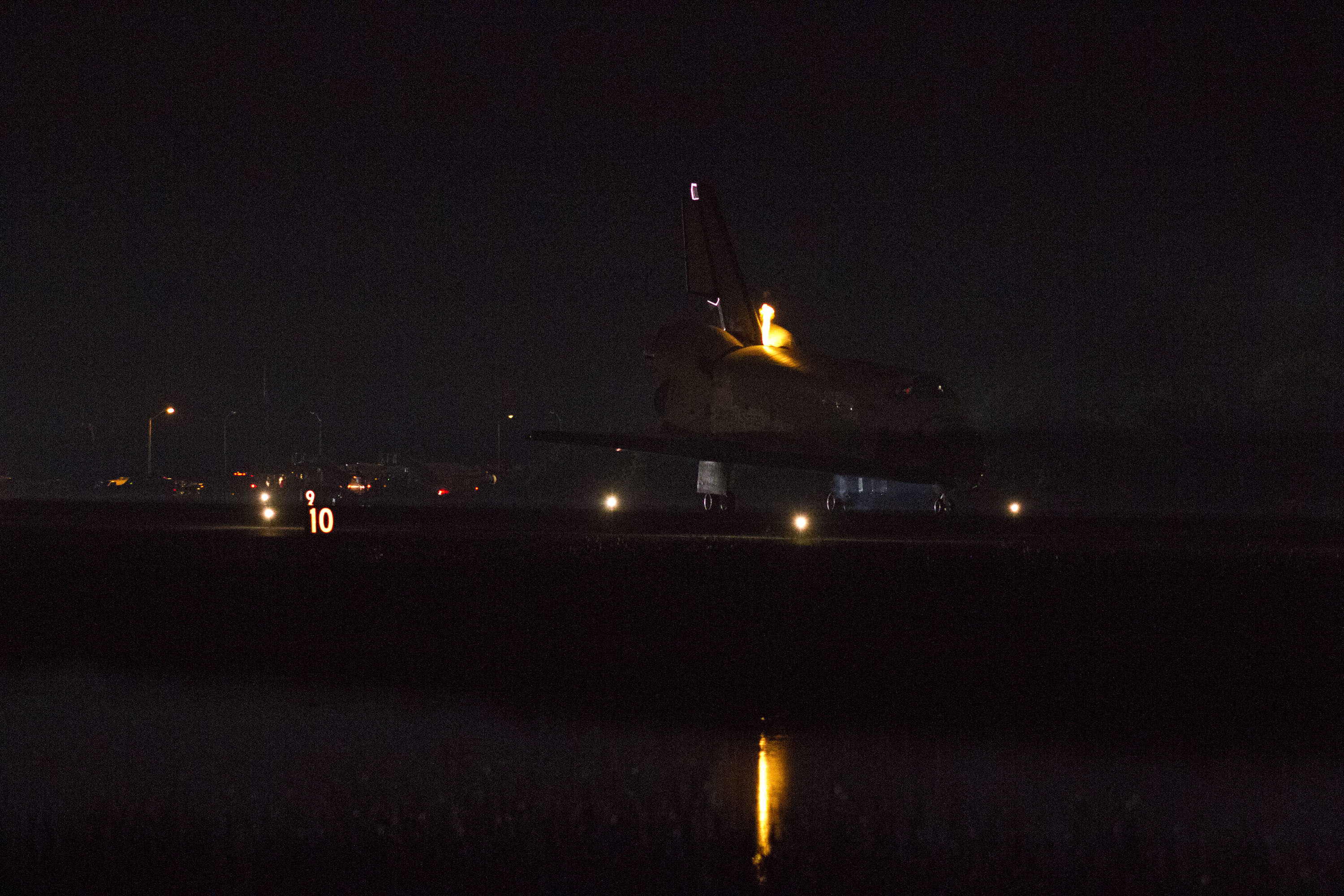
Endeavour after wheel stop at the Kennedy Space Center.

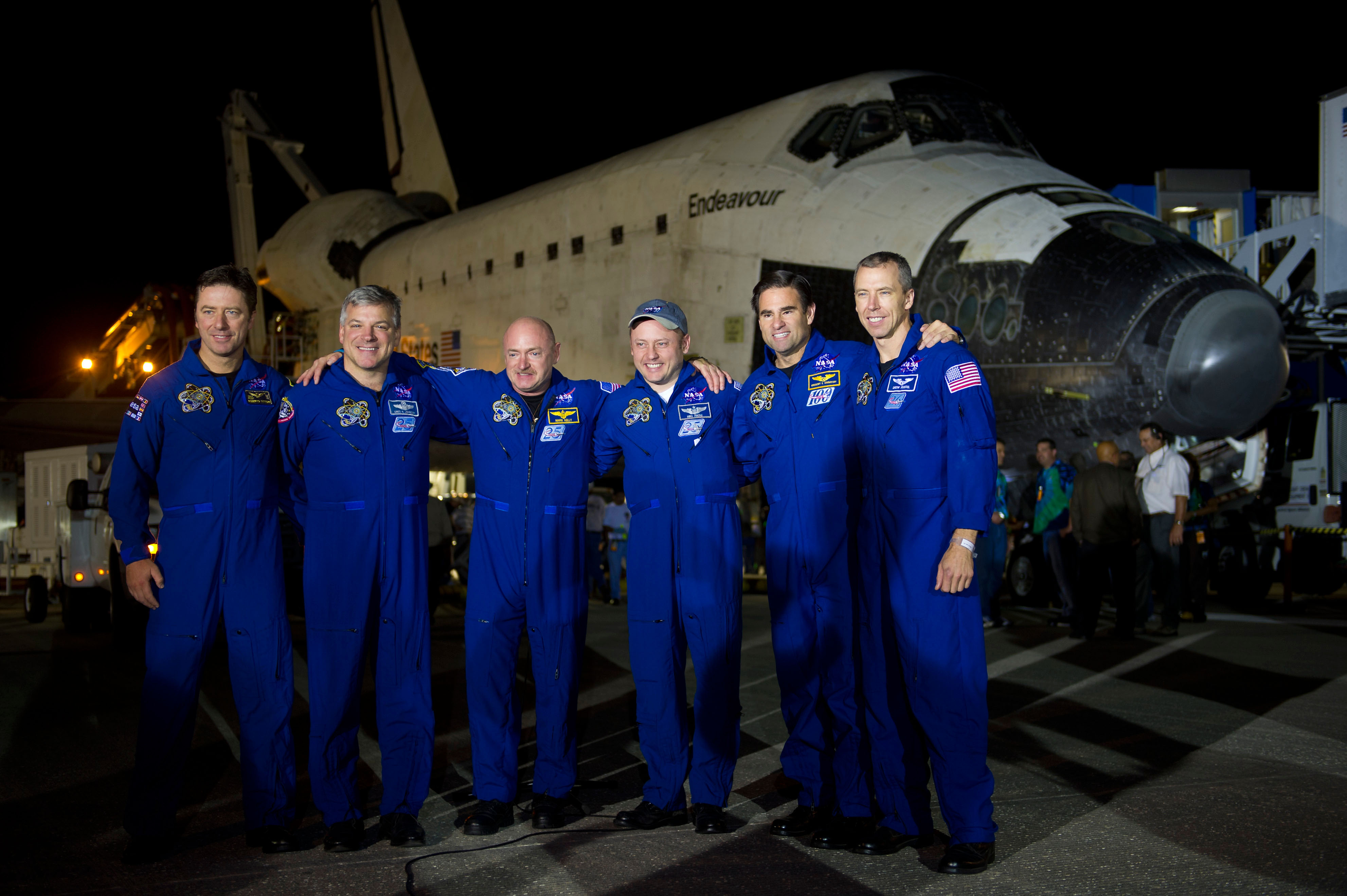
The crew pose for a photo on the runway after landing.

== Spacewalks ==
There were four spacewalks (EVAs) completed by three astronauts during the flight. The total time spent outside was 28 hours and 44 minutes. The EVAs were the final EVAs conducted by a shuttle crew.

EVA	Spacewalkers	Start (UTC)	End (UTC)	Duration
EVA 1	Drew Feustel; Greg Chamitoff	May 20, 2011; 07:10	May 20, 2011; 13:29	6 hours 19 minutes
EVA 1	Feustel and Chamitoff retrieved the two MISSE 7 experiments and installed a new package of MISSE 8 experiments on ELC-2, which was already on the station. They installed jumpers between segments on the left-side truss, or backbone, of the station, for ammonia refills, and vented nitrogen from an ammonia servicer. They also began to install an external wireless communication antenna on the Destiny laboratory to provide wireless communication to the Express Logistics Carriers mounted on the station's truss, but the installation was cut short due to a bad CO_{2} sensor in Chamitoff's suit.			
EVA 2	Feustel; Mike Fincke	May 22, 2011; 06:05	May 22, 2011; 14:12	8 hours 07 minutes
EVA 2	Feustel and Fincke refilled the Port 6 (P5) radiators with ammonia. They completed venting the early ammonia system, and lubricated the port solar alpha rotary joint and parts of Dextre, a two-armed space station robot capable of handling delicate assembly tasks currently performed by spacewalkers. Fincke also installed grapple bars on the port radiators.			
EVA 3	Feustel; Fincke	May 25, 2011; 05:43	May 25, 2011; 12:37	6 hours 54 minutes
EVA 3	Feustel and Fincke installed a grapple fixture (a handle for the station's Canadarm2 to grab on to) on the Zarya module, to support robotic operations based from the Russian segment. They also installed additional cables to provide backup power to the Russian portion of the space station. The pair finished installing the wireless video system that was left unfinished during EVA 1.			
EVA 4	Fincke; Chamitoff	May 27, 2011; 04:15	May 27, 2011; 11:39	7 hours 24 minutes
EVA 4	Fincke and Chamitoff stowed the shuttle's 50-foot Orbiter Boom Sensor System (OBSS) on the right-side truss on a permanent stowage fixture. The pair then retrieved a grapple from the station's left-side truss and used it as a replacement for the grapple previously on the boom. They then released restraints from one of the spare arms for Dextre and replaced thermal insulation on one of the spare gas tanks for the Quest Airlock. The spacewalk marked the completion of the US Orbital Segment of the ISS.			

== Wake-up calls ==
NASA began a tradition of playing music to astronauts during the Gemini program, and first used music to wake up a flight crew during Apollo 15. Each track is specially chosen, often by the astronauts' families, and usually has a special meaning to an individual member of the crew, or is applicable to their daily activities.

NASA opened the selection process to the public for the first time for STS-133, where the public was invited to vote on two songs used to wake up astronauts on previous missions to wake up the STS-133 crew. For STS-134, the public was invited to submit original songs, with two songs being selected to wake up the crew of Endeavour.

Flight Day	Song	Artist	Played for
Day 2	"Beautiful Day"	U2	Mark Kelly
Day 3	"Drops of Jupiter"	Train	Greg Johnson
Day 4	"Luna"	José Serrano	Gregory Chamitoff
Day 5	"We All Do What We Can Do"	Dan Keenan and Kenny McLaughlin	Mike Fincke
Day 6	"In View"	The Tragically Hip	Drew Feustel
Day 7	"Il Mio Pensiero"	Ligabue	Roberto Vittori
Day 8	"Times Like These"	Foo Fighters	Drew Feustel
Day 9	"Svegliarsi la mattina"	Zero Assoluto	Roberto Vittori
Day 10	"Real World"	Matchbox Twenty	Greg Johnson
Day 11	"Countdown"	Rush	Mike Fincke
Day 12	"Fun, Fun, Fun"	Max Q	STS-134 Crew
Day 13	"Will You Carry Me?"	Michael FitzPatrick	STS-134 Crew
Day 14	"Galaxy Song"	Clint Black	STS-134 Crew
Day 15	"Slowness"	Calexico	Mark Kelly
Day 16	"Dreams You Give"	Brian Plunkett	STS-134 Crew
Day 17	"Sunrise Number 1"	Stormy Mondays	Mark Kelly

== See also ==
- 2011 in spaceflight
- List of human spaceflights
- List of International Space Station spacewalks
- List of Space Shuttle missions
- List of spacewalks 2000–2014
- STS-135
