= Soyuz TMA-02M =

2011 Russian crewed spaceflight to the ISS

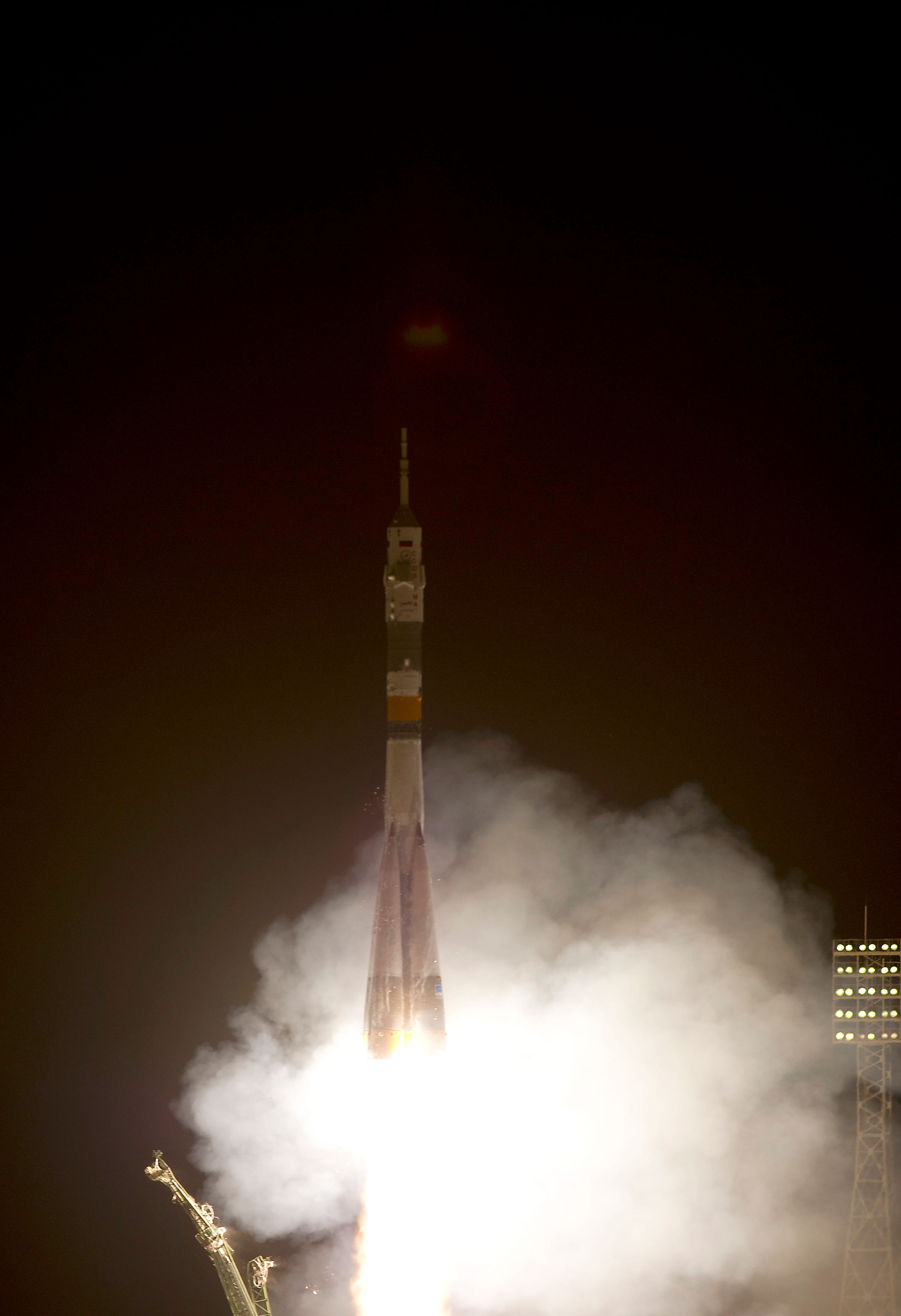
- The Soyuz TMA-02M rocket launches from the Baikonur Cosmodrome.
- Operator: Roscosmos
- COSPAR ID: 2011-023A
- SATCAT no.: 37633
- Mission duration: 166d, 06h, 13m

Spacecraft properties
- Spacecraft type: Soyuz-TMA 11F747
- Manufacturer: Energia

Crew
- Crew size: 3
- Members: Sergey Volkov; Satoshi Furukawa; Michael E. Fossum

Start of mission
- Launch date: 7 June 2011, 20:12 UTC
- Rocket: Soyuz-FG
- Launch site: Baikonur 1/5

End of mission
- Landing date: 22 November 2011, 02:26 UTC

Orbital parameters
- Reference system: Geocentric
- Regime: Low Earth

Docking with ISS
- Docking port: Rassvet nadir
- Docking date: 9 June 2011; 21:18 UTC
- Undocking date: 21 November 2011; 23:00 UTC
- Time docked: 165d 1h 42m
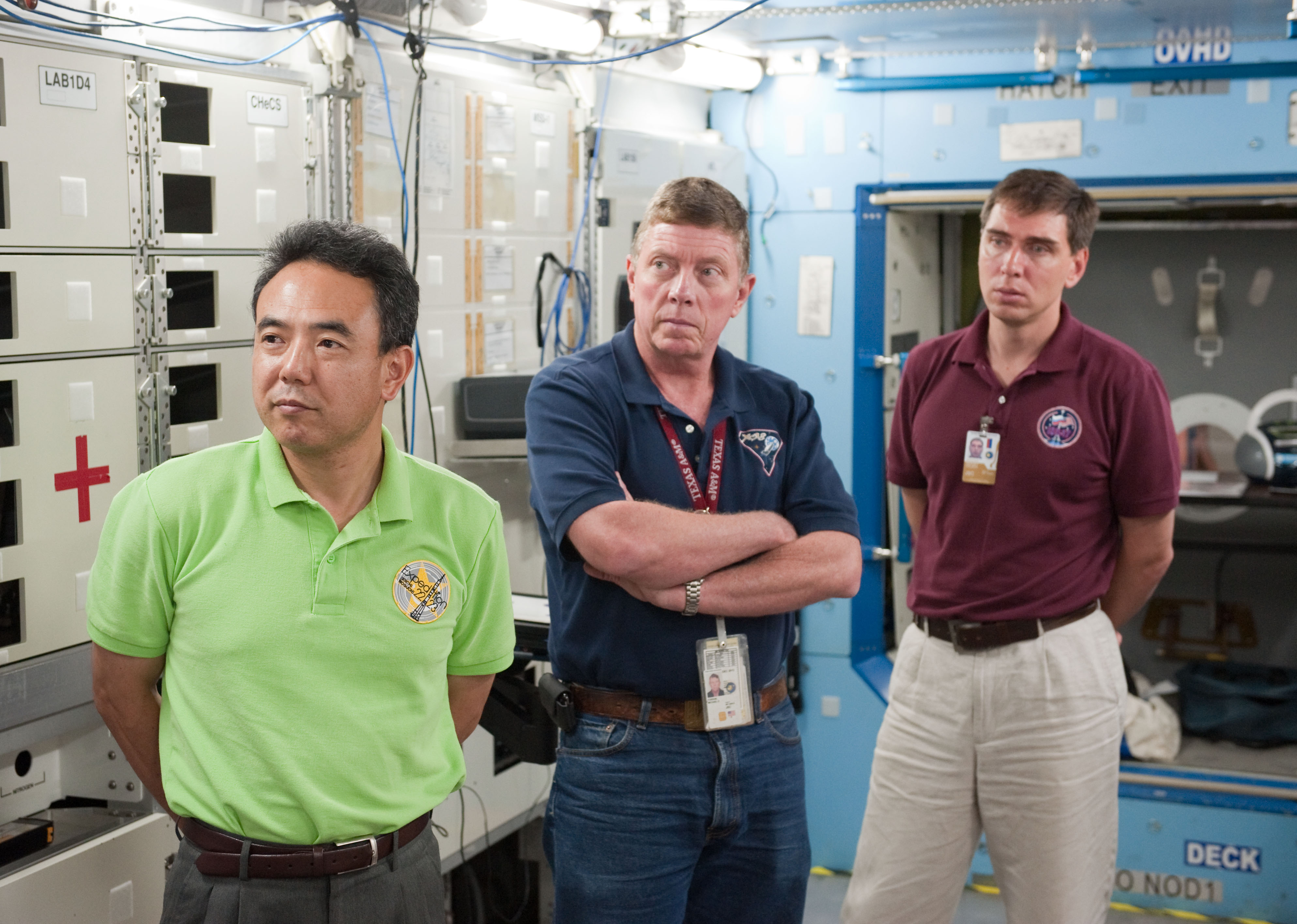
- From left to right: Furukawa, Fossum and Volkov Soyuz programme (Crewed missions)

Soyuz TMA-02M was a space mission that transported three members of the Expedition 28 crew to the International Space Station. TMA-02M was the 110th flight of a Soyuz spacecraft (first launched 1967) and the second flight of the improved Soyuz-TMA-M series (first launched 7 October 2010). The Soyuz remained docked to the space station for the Expedition 28 increment to serve as a potential emergency escape vehicle.

The Soyuz spacecraft launched from the Baikonur Cosmodrome in Kazakhstan on Tuesday, 7 June 2011 at 20:12 UTC (8 June 2011, 02:12 local time). Originally expected to dock with the International Space Station around 05:22 pm EDT on Thursday, 9 June 2011, the Soyuz docked with the ISS at 5:18 pm EDT, four minutes ahead of schedule. The spacecraft carried to the ISS a three-person crew (Sergey Volkov, Russia; Michael E. Fossum, U.S.; Satoshi Furukawa, Japan). The crew landed in Kazakhstan at 02:26 UTC on 22 November 2011.

== Crew ==
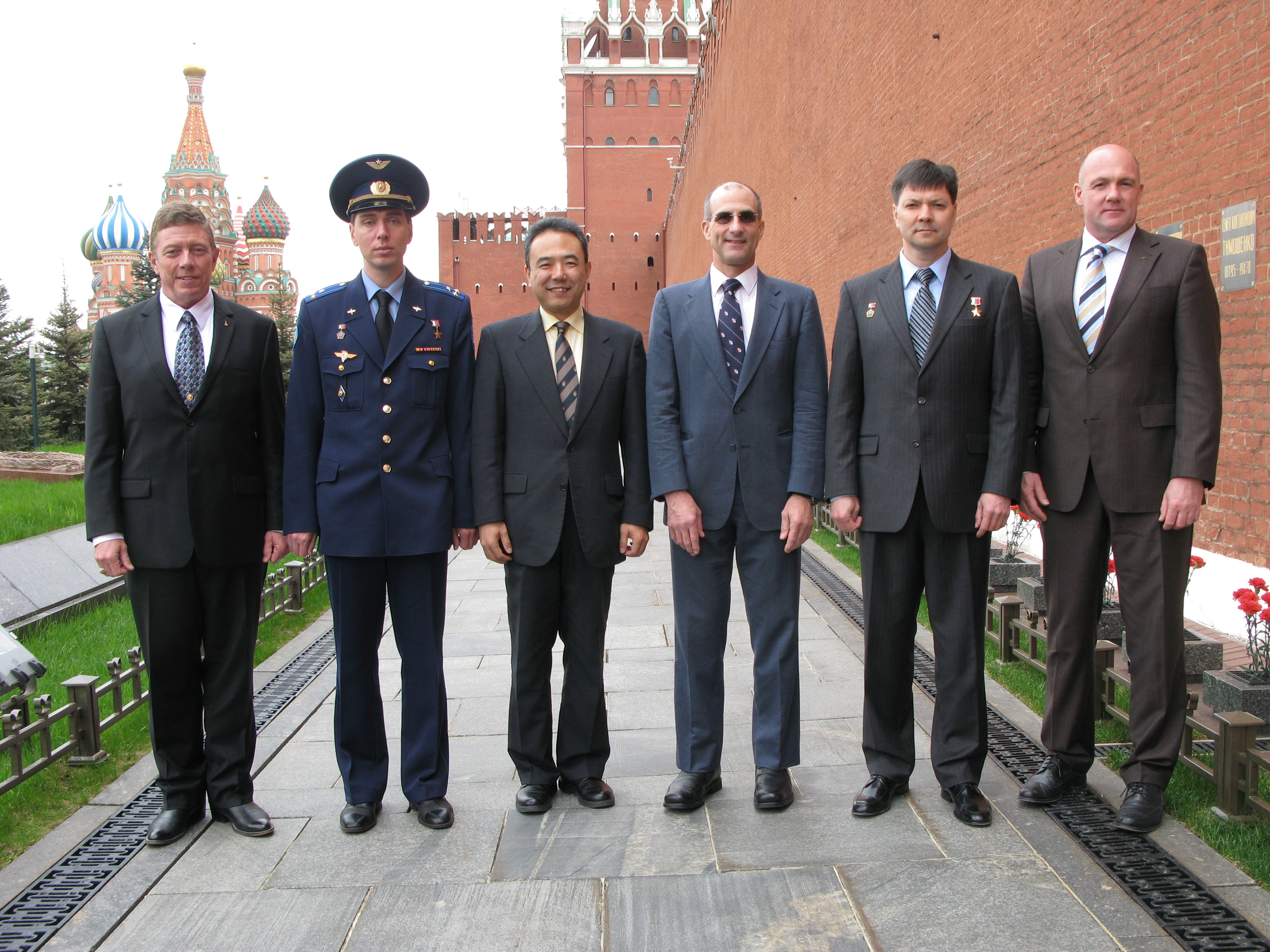
The Soyuz TMA-02M prime and backup crews conduct their ceremonial tour on 16 May 2011.

Position	Crew Member
Commander	(Russia) Sergey Volkov, Roscosmos; Expedition 28; Second spaceflight
Flight Engineer 1	(Japan) Satoshi Furukawa, JAXA; Expedition 28; First spaceflight
Flight Engineer 2	(United States) Michael E. Fossum, NASA; Expedition 28; Third and last spaceflight

=== Backup crew ===
Position	Crew Member
Commander	(Russia) Oleg Kononenko, Roscosmos
Flight Engineer 1	(Netherlands) André Kuipers, ESA
Flight Engineer 2	(United States) Donald R. Pettit, NASA

== Mission patch ==
The former chief of Roscosmos, Anatoly Perminov, approved the Soyuz TMA-02M patch on 11 March 2011. A drawing of a rocket ship by an 8-year-old artist Katya Ikramova from Krasnoyarsk, Russia offered the inspiration for the Soyuz TMA-02M mission patch.

== Pre-launch processing ==
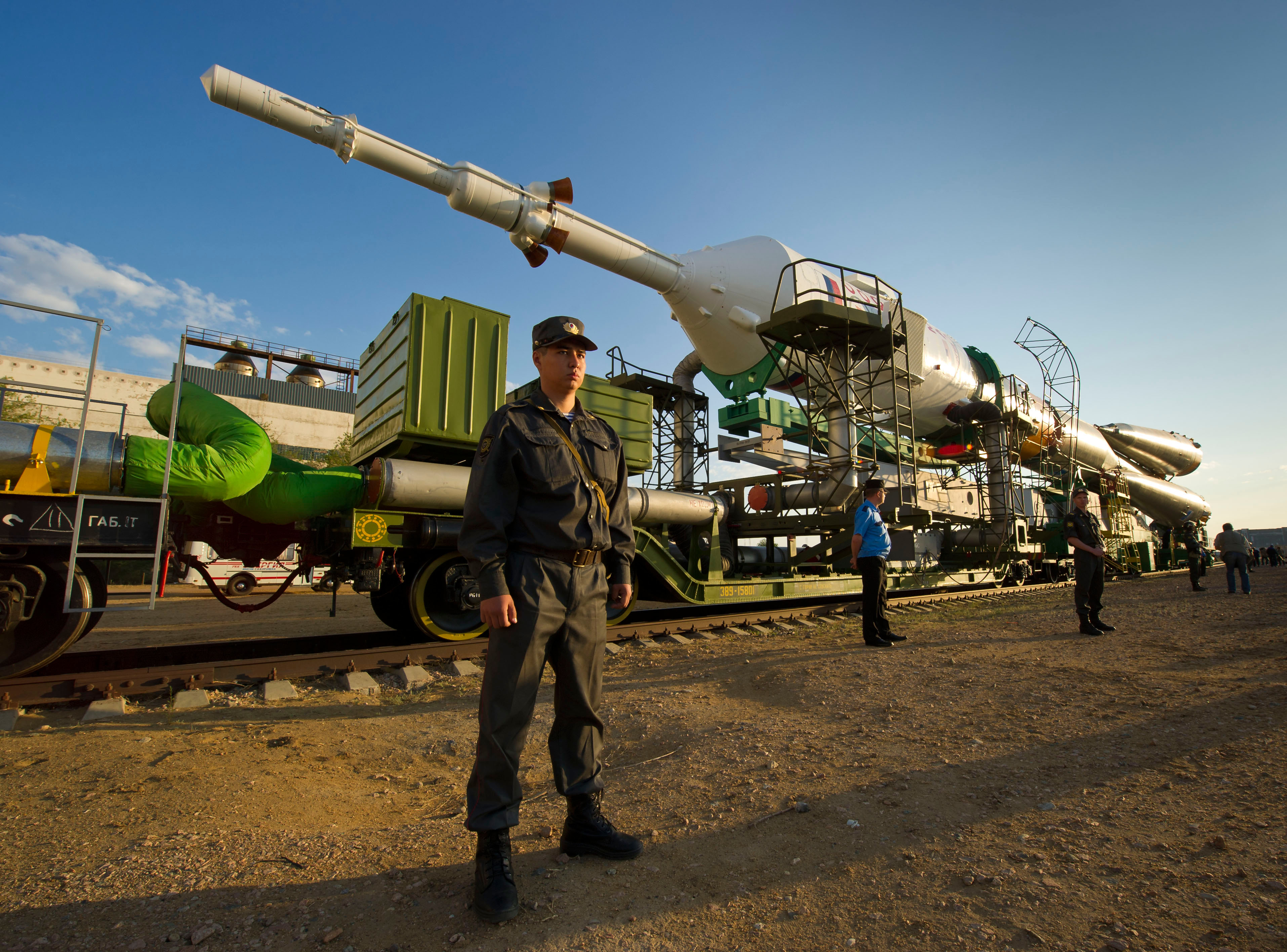
The Soyuz TMA-02M spacecraft is rolled out by train on its way to the launch pad.

On 21 April 2011, a train from RSC-Energia arrived at the Turatam railway station to deliver Soyuz TMA-02M. After a customs clearance, the spacecraft was transported to the integration and test facility at Baikonur for further pre-launch processing. The pre-launch processing continued at Baikonur following the delivery. The Soyuz spacecraft underwent testing in the acoustic chamber in early May. The purpose of the test was to verify the Kurs system responsible for rendezvous and docking. After the test, the Soyuz was prepared for leak checks in the vacuum chamber. Final testing including pneumatic tests of the Soyuz-FG rocket continued from 16 to 27 May.

During a meeting held on 23 May to discuss the flight readiness, the Roscosmos Board approved Soyuz TMA-02M launch on 8 June 2011.

On 27 May, the spacecraft was delivered to the filling station at Site 31 for further tanking of the Soyuz propulsion system by propellant components and pressurized gases. The tanking operations continued to the next day. Post tanking operations will continue between 29 May and 3 June. The integration with the launching FG rocket is planned for 4 June. The launch campaign at pad 1 will commence on 5 June and will continue until the launch date of 8 June.

== Crew training ==
Our crew is very harmonious, I am confident in my colleagues. The vehicle is in proper status, we are eager about going to space. We wish we could fly around the station, but this task is not in our list, as our mission implies tests of the second Soyuz of TMA-M 'digital' series, so we will verify its systems during the mission. I hope the mission will be successful. – Sergey Volkov

The Gagarin Cosmonaut Training Center hosted two-day exam sessions for the Soyuz TMA-02M prime and backup crews on 12–13 May 2011. On 12 May, the prime crew passed their integrated training in the ISS simulator while their backups were examined in the Soyuz mockup. The ISS integrated test aims to simulate a working day at the Space Station with instructors introducing few contingencies. On the next day the crews swapped and took the exams.

Soyuz TMA-02M crews arrived at Baikonur on 25 May 2011. After departing from the Chkalovsky airport in Moscow, the plane with the prime crew first landed in Krainy airport at 1 pm local time. Their backups landed 20 minutes later in the next plane. On 26 May 2011, the prime and backup crews began their first training session at Baikonur's Site 254. The prime crew verified cargo accommodation in the Soyuz descent capsule, donned their Sokol space suits; performed leak checks; and tested the helmet communication system. They also trained with the laser range meter, navigator and other systems. The backup crew of Kononenko, Pettit and Kuipers, with the exception of wearing Sokol suits also trained with the Soyuz systems.

== Spacecraft ==
Soyuz TMA-02M is the second mission using the upgraded Soyuz-TMA-M spacecraft, which has a modernised flight control system and reduced mass. TMA-02M is the second and last flight development test. The third flight (Soyuz TMA-03M) will be a qualification test and will conclude the flight testing programme. The spacecraft was designed and manufactured by Energia, the largest company of the Russian space industry.

== Mission highlights ==
Soyuz TMA-02М was successfully launched from the Baikonur Cosmodrome on Tuesday, 7 June 2011 at 21:12 UTC (8 June 2011, 2:12 am local Baikonur time). The spacecraft docked with the International Space Station 5:18 pm on Thursday, 9 June 2011, linking with the Rassvet module of the ISS. The Soyuz transported a three-person international crew to the International Space Station (Sergey Volkov, Russia – mission commander; Michael E. Fossum, U.S.; Satoshi Furukawa, Japan), who remained there until mid-November 2011.

On board the ISS the Soyuz crew joined the Russian cosmonauts Andrei Borisenko and Aleksandr Samokutyayev and the NASA astronaut Ron Garan, their fellow crew members of Expedition 28.

== Return to Earth ==
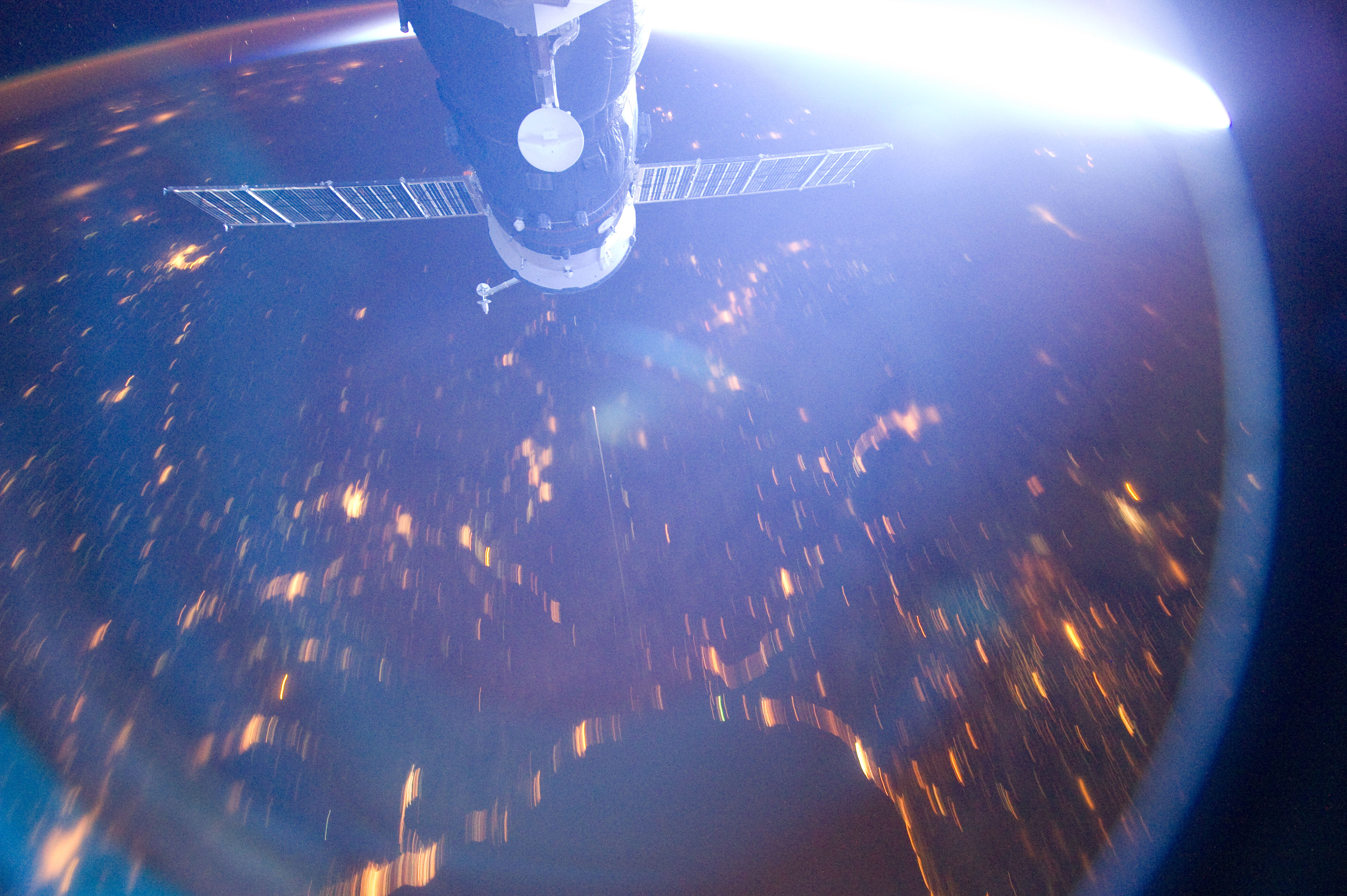
Plasma trail below the Progress freighter

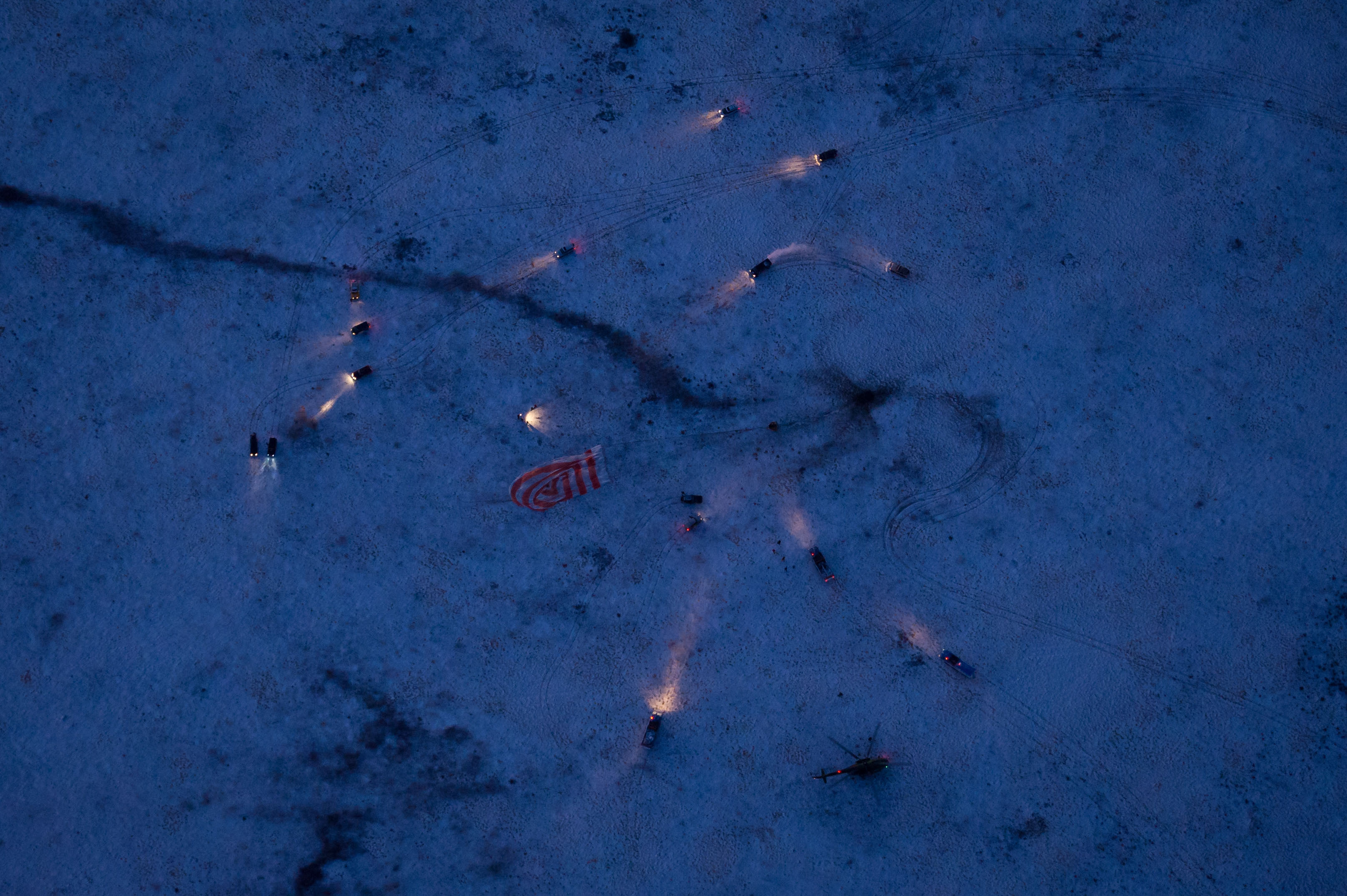
The Soyuz TMA-02M landing site from above

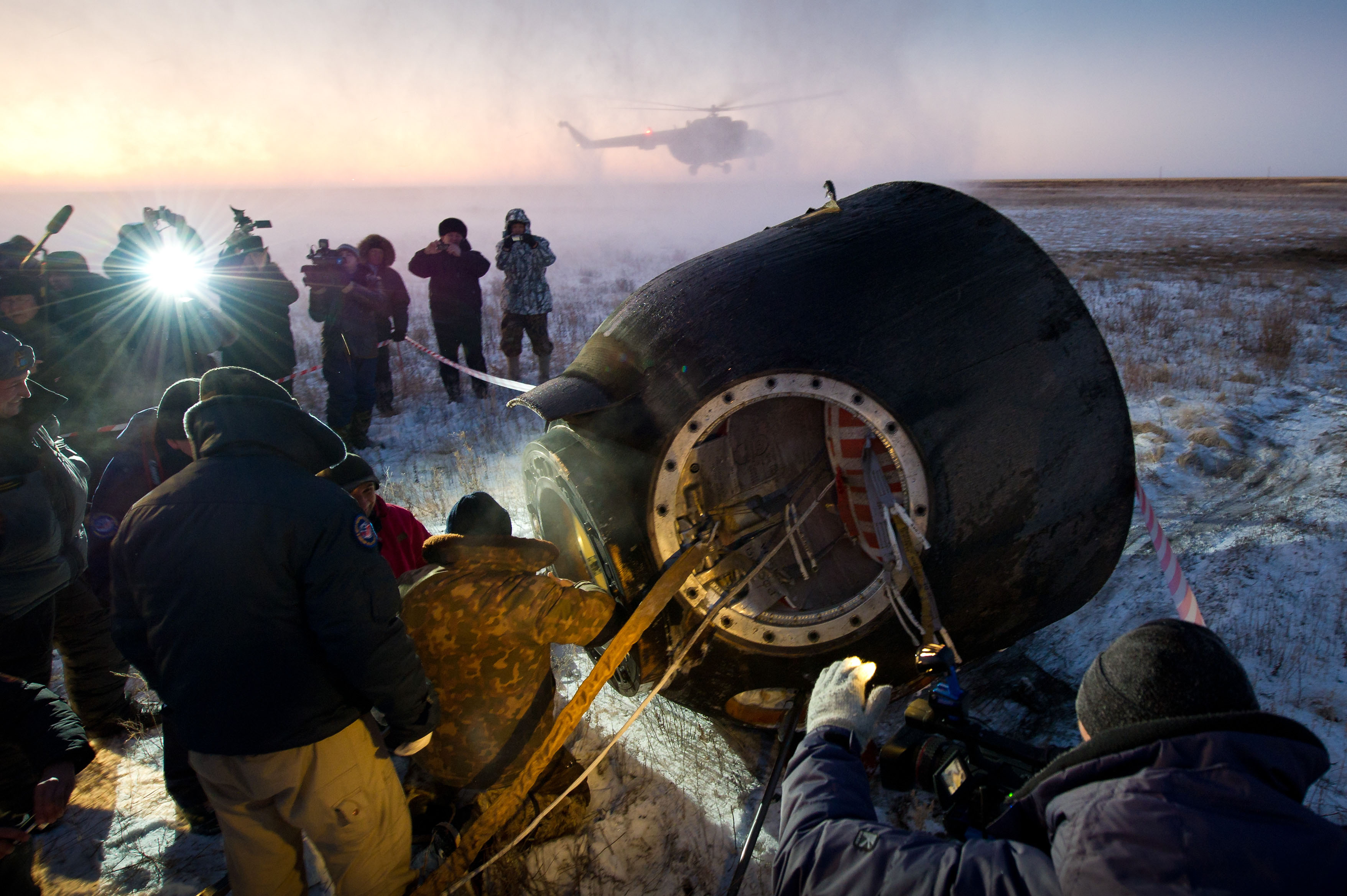
The Soyuz capsule shortly after landing

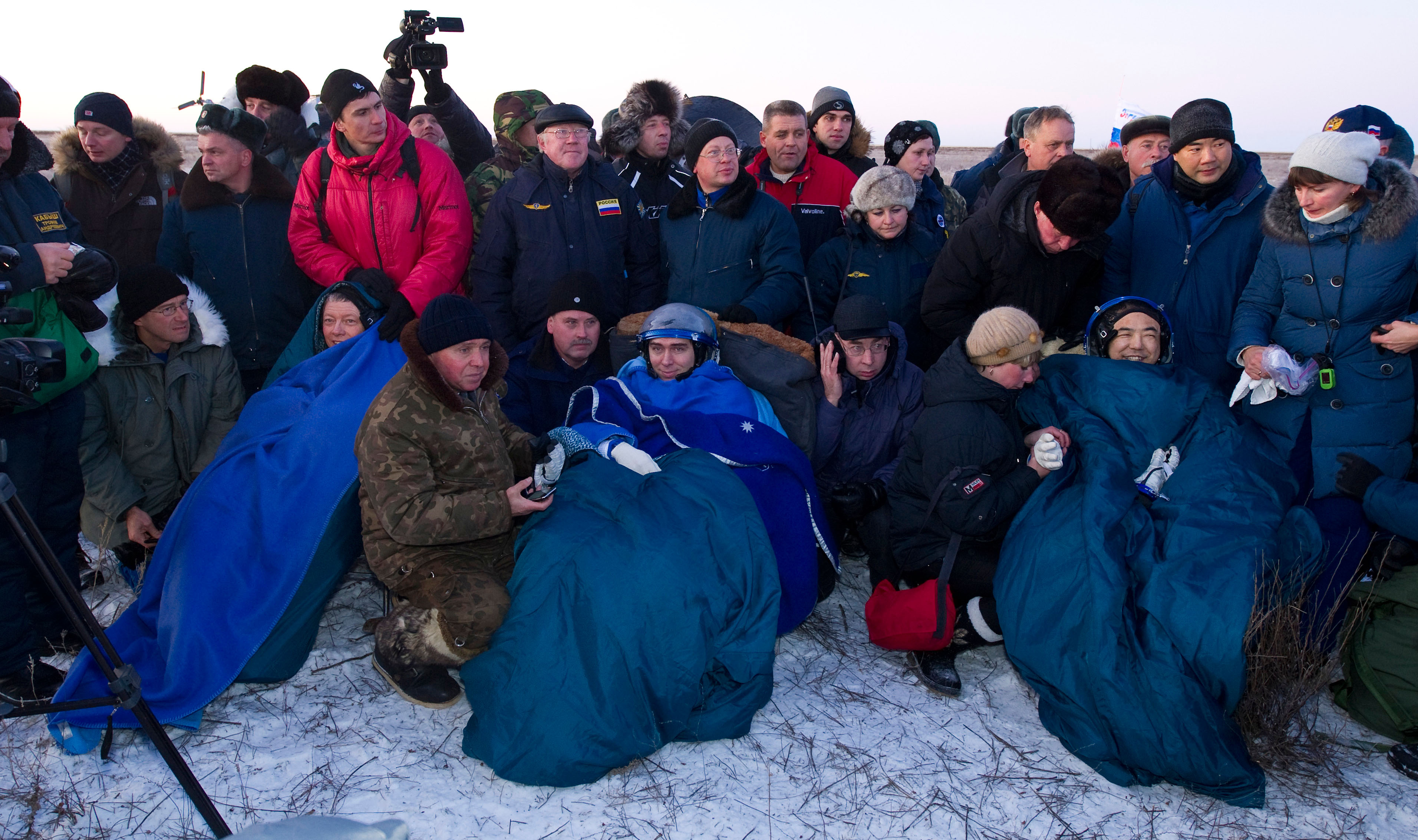
The extracted Soyuz crew
