= Michael E. Fossum =

American astronaut and engineer (born 1957)

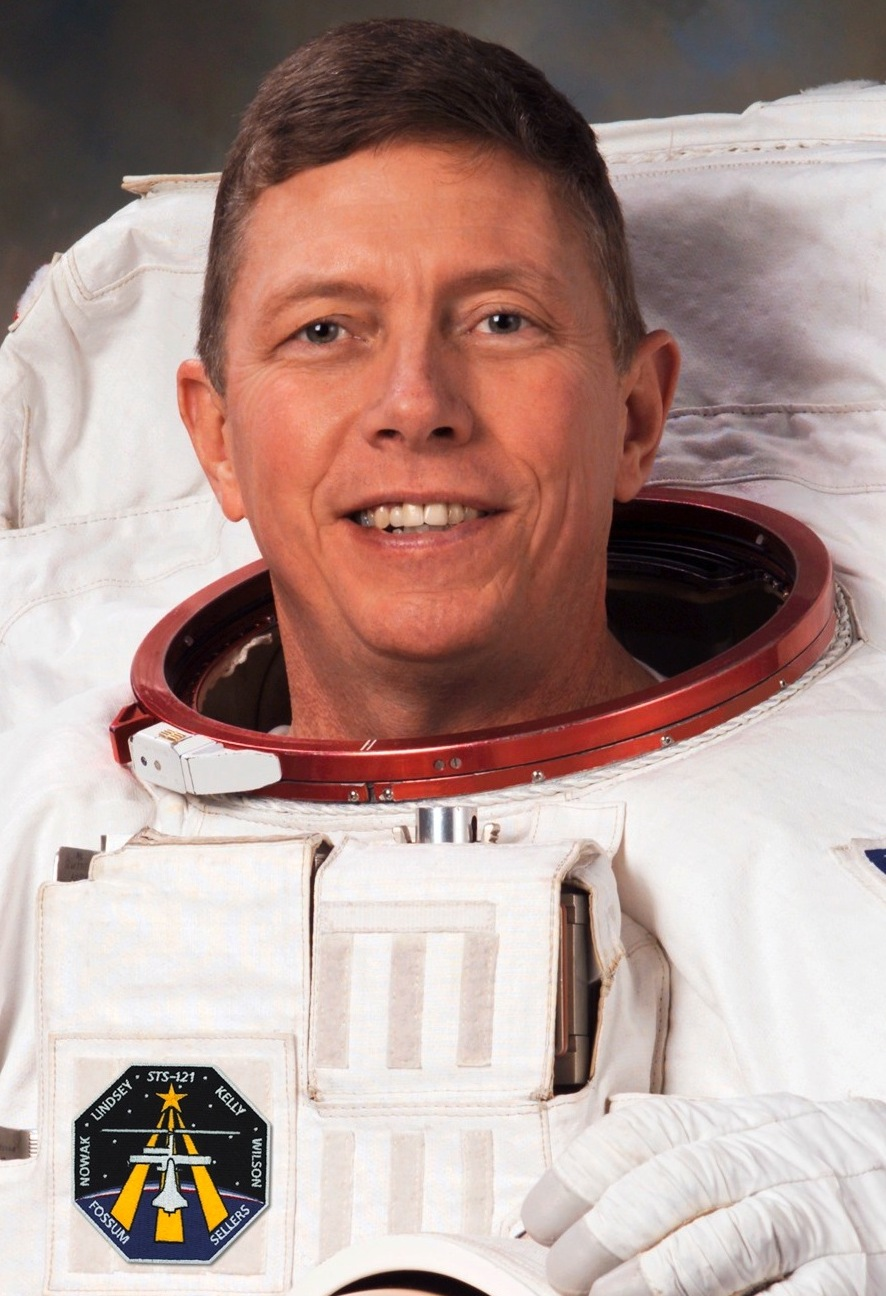
- Fossum in 2004
- Born: December 19, 1957 (age 68); Sioux Falls, South Dakota, U.S.
- Education: Texas A&M University (BS); University of Houston (MS)
- Space career

NASA astronaut
- Status: Retired
- Time in space: 193d 19h 2m
- Selection: 1998 NASA Group
- Total EVAs: 7
- Total EVA time: 48 hours, 32 minutes
- Mission: STS-121, STS-124, Soyuz TMA-02M (Expedition 28/29)
- Retired: January 7, 2017

Michael Edward Fossum (born December 19, 1957, in Sioux Falls, South Dakota) is an American former astronaut, engineer, and the Chief Operating Officer of Texas A&M University at Galveston. He flew into space on board the NASA Space Shuttle missions STS-121 and STS-124 and served as a mission specialist of Expedition 28 and commander of Expedition 29 aboard the International Space Station.

== Air Force ==
Fossum was involved with the United States Air Force during his undergraduate years at Texas A&M and served as commander of Squadron 3 in the Corps of Cadets. He graduated in mechanical engineering in 1980. He received his master's in physical science (space science) from the University of Houston. He was selected to attend Air Force Test Pilot School from which he flew 34 different types of aircraft. He left active duty for the Air Force Reserve in 1992 to work for NASA and retired as a colonel in the USAFR in 2010.

== NASA ==
The first time Fossum became interested in being an astronaut was at age 12 while watching the Apollo 11 Moon landing. He rekindled this dream while with the Air Force at Johnson Space Center during the early 1990s.

In January 1993, Fossum was employed by NASA as a systems engineer. His primary responsibilities were to evaluate the Russian Soyuz spacecraft for use as an emergency escape vehicle for the new International Space Station. Later in 1993, Fossum was selected to represent the Flight Crew Operations Directorate in an extensive redesign of the International Space Station (ISS). After this, he continued work for the crew office and Mission Operations Directorate in the area of assembly operations. In 1996, Fossum supported the Astronaut Office as a Technical Assistant for Space Shuttle, supporting design and management reviews. In 1997, he served as a Flight Test Engineer on the X-38, a prototype crew escape vehicle for the ISS, which was under development in house by the Engineering Directorate at NASA-JSC and flight tested at NASA Dryden.

Fossum was selected by NASA as an astronaut candidate in June 1998, having applied during almost every selection period since 1988 (7 times). He reported for training in August 1998. Fossum previously served as the Astronaut Office Lead for ISS flight software development. As a Capsule Communicator (CAPCOM) in Mission Control, Fossum supported several flights, including Lead CAPCOM for ISS Expedition 6. A veteran of three space flights, STS-121 in 2006, STS-124 in 2008 and Expedition 28/29 in 2011, Fossum has logged more than 194 days in space, including more than 48 hours of Extravehicular Activity (EVA) in seven spacewalks.

After returning to Earth in 2011, Fossum has served in a number of capacities, including assistant to the chief of the astronaut office for the International Space Station.

== Space flight ==
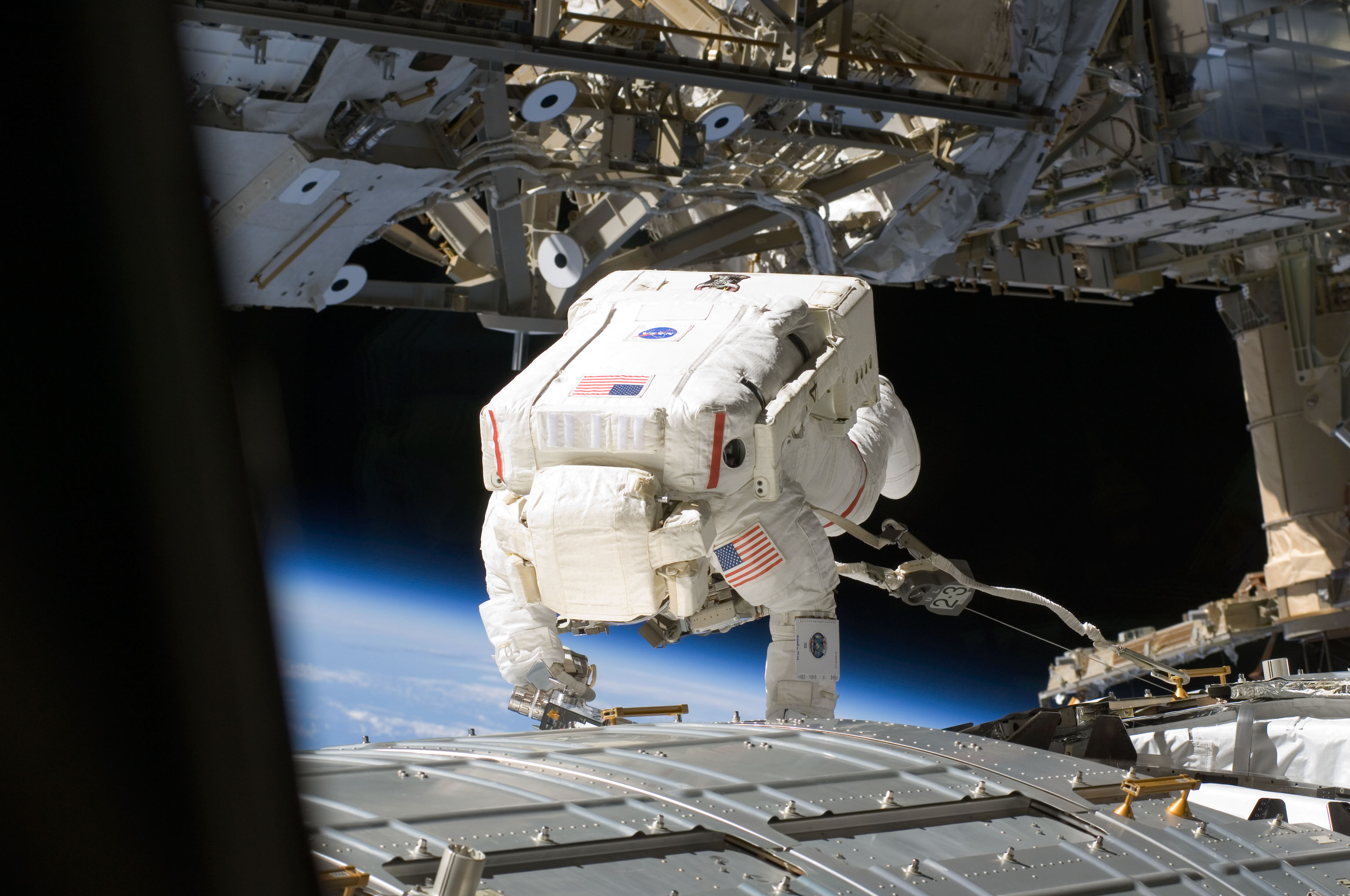
Fossum during a spacewalk

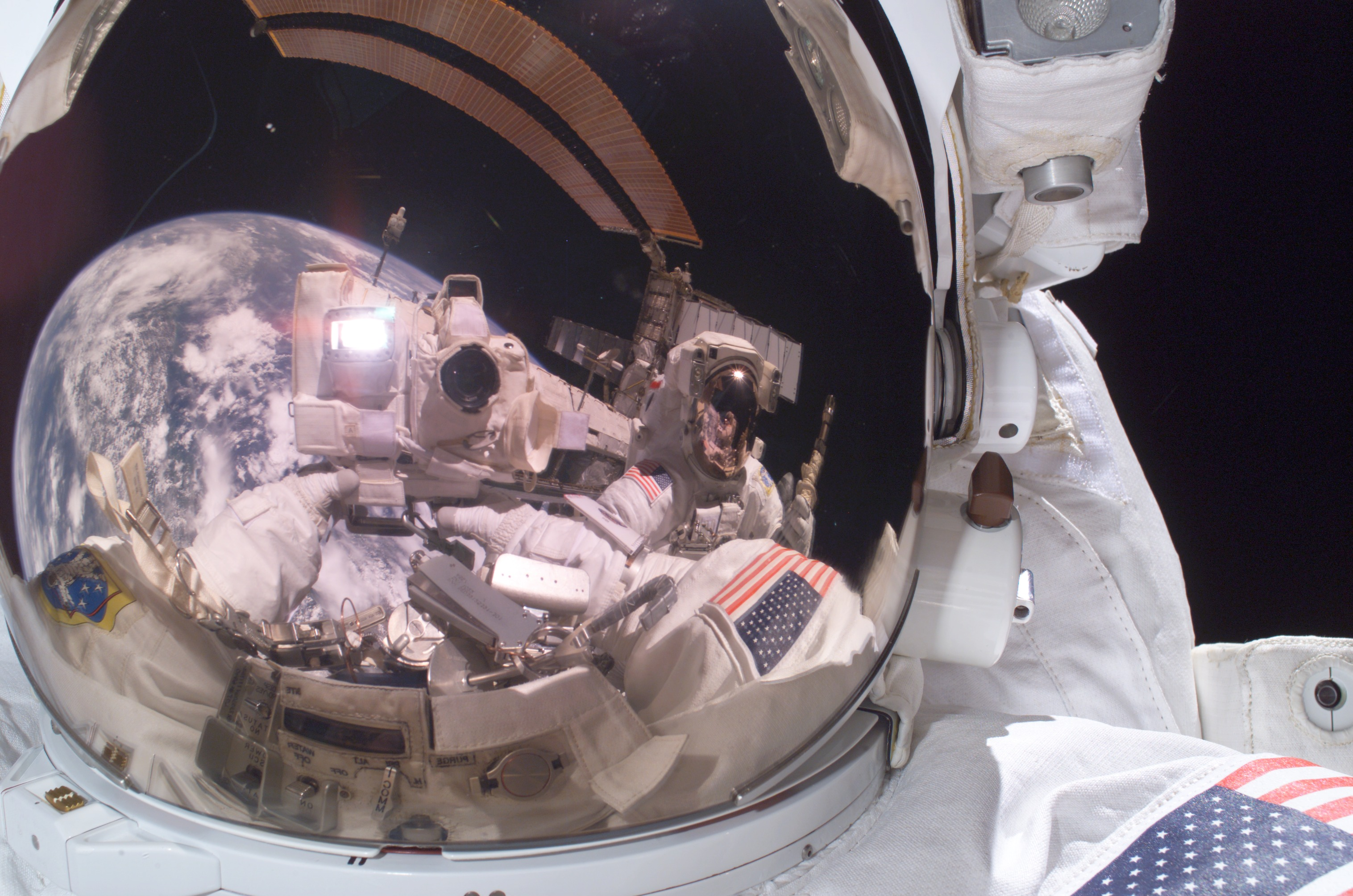
A self-portrait of Fossum taken on a spacewalk, listed on Popular Science's photo gallery of the best astronaut selfies.

He entered space for the first time on July 4, 2006, as a mission specialist of mission STS-121 to the International Space Station where he participated in three spacewalks. On July 8, Fossum with Piers Sellers conducted a 7 and a half hour spacewalk making a repair to the ISS and testing using the Shuttle's arm as a platform for making repairs to the Shuttle.

In 2008, Fossum assumed the role of mission specialist on board STS-124 launching on May 31, 2008. The mission's primary objective was the delivery and installment of Japan's Kibo Laboratory module. Once attached, this module became the largest and most scientifically capable addition to the International Space Station. Fossum took part in the installation as lead spacewalker, EVA-1, accompanied by fellow spacewalker Ron Garan. They did three spacewalks during the 14-day mission.

On June 7, 2011, Fossum launched with crewmates Sergey Alexandrovich Volkov and Satoshi Furukawa on Soyuz TMA-02M from the Baikonur Cosmodrome, Kazakhstan, to the ISS to join the crew of Expedition 28. Upon the departure of Expedition 28, Fossum served as ISS commander during Expedition 29 from September 9 until November 21, 2011. He returned to Earth on November 22, 2011. During Expedition 28, Fossum performed his seventh EVA with Ronald Garan which lasted 6 hours and 31 minutes. During the EVA They retrieved a failed pump module for return to Earth, installed two experiments and repaired a new base for the Canada Arm 2.

== Texas A&M University at Galveston ==
In January 2017, Fossum left NASA and accepted a position with Texas A&M University at Galveston as vice president and chief operating officer. In October 2019, Colonel Fossum was appointed as Superintendent of Texas A&M Maritime Academy.

== Personal ==
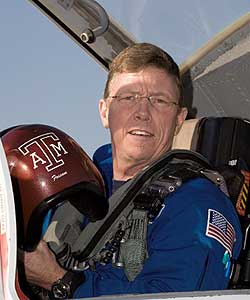
Fossum with a Texas A&M helmet

Fossum is married to the former Melanie J. London and they have four children together.

One of Michael's son's, Mitchell (callsign FORGE), is the commander of the 336 Fighter Squadron.

As an Eagle Scout, he is heavily involved with the Boy Scouts of America (BSA) as well as the Order of the Arrow and is the Scoutmaster of Troop 1598 based in Webster, TX. The BSA has honored him with its Distinguished Eagle Scout Award.

A junior high school in McAllen, Texas, has been named after Fossum.

== Awards and decorations ==
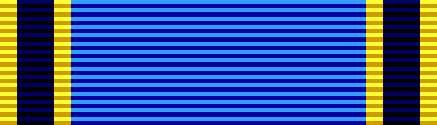
Meritorious Service Medal with two oak leaf clusters
NASA Exceptional Service Medal
NASA Space Flight Medal
NASA Exceptional Service Medal
National Defense Service Medal with service star
Air Force Longevity Service Award with four oak leaf clusters
Air Force Training Ribbon

Preceded by Andrei Borisenko	ISS Expedition Commander; 16 September to 21 November 2011	Succeeded by Daniel Burbank
