= Expedition 28 =

Long-duration mission to the International Space Station

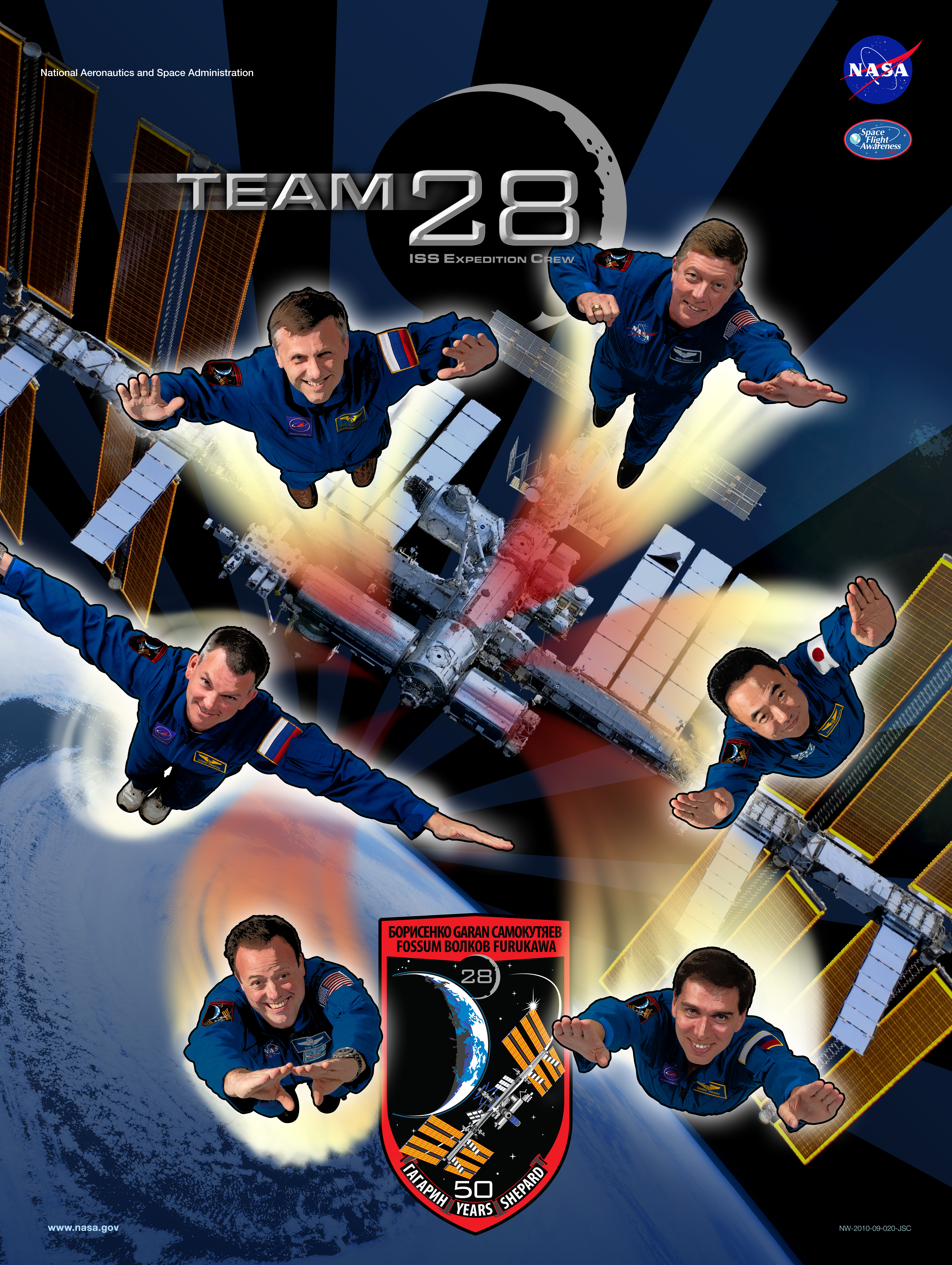
- Promotional Poster
- Mission type: Long-duration expedition

Expedition
- Space station: International Space Station
- Began: 23 May 2011, 21:35 UTC
- Ended: 16 September 2011, 00:38 UTC
- Arrived aboard: Soyuz TMA-21; Soyuz TMA-02M
- Departed aboard: Soyuz TMA-21; Soyuz TMA-02M

Crew
- Crew size: 6
- Members: Expedition 27/28: Andrey Borisenko; Aleksandr Samokutyayev; Ron Garan Expedition 28/29: Sergey Volkov; Mike Fossum; Satoshi Furukawa
- EVAs: 2
- EVA duration: 12 hours, 54 minutes
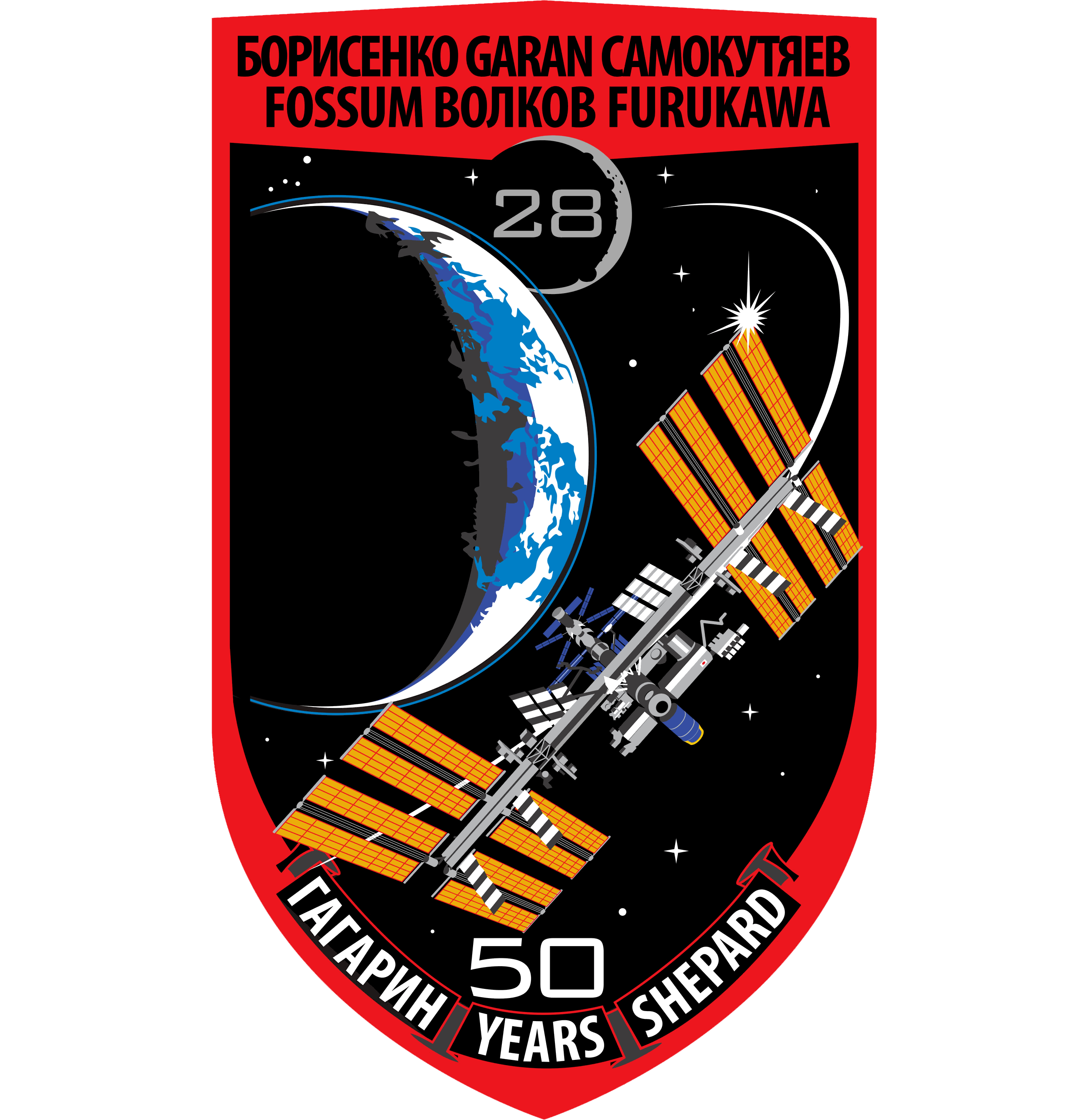
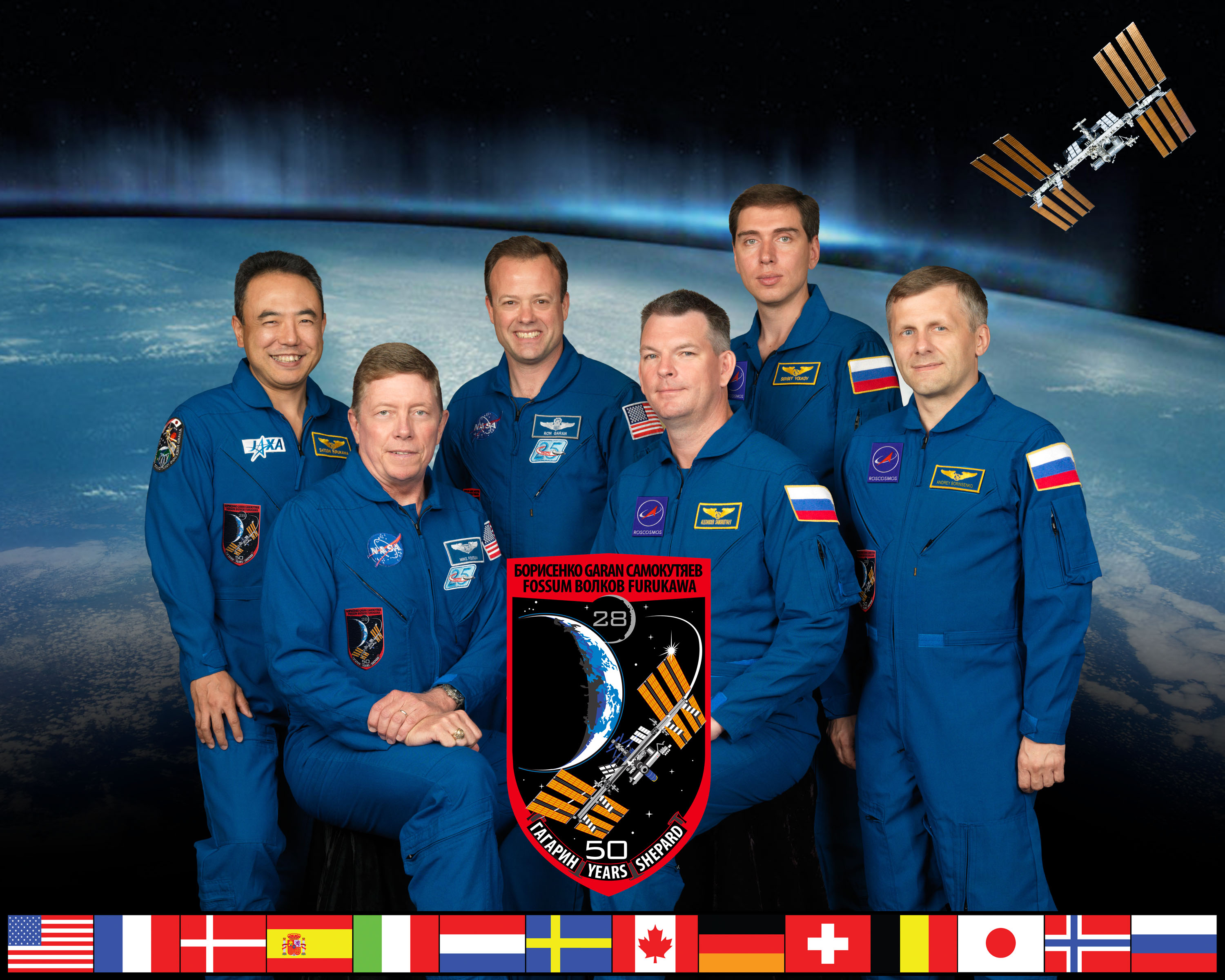
- Expedition 28 mission patch (l-r) Furukawa, Fossum, Garan, Samokutyayev, Volkov and Borisenko ISS expeditions

Expedition 28 was the 28th long-duration expedition to the International Space Station, and began on 23 May 2011 with the departure of the members of Expedition 27. The first three members of Expedition 28 arrived on the ISS aboard the Soyuz TMA-21 spacecraft on 4 April 2011, and were joined on 9 June 2011 by the three other crew members, who arrived aboard Soyuz TMA-02M. The expedition saw a number of significant events, including the final Space Shuttle mission, STS-135, which took place in July 2011. Expedition 28 was superseded by Expedition 29 on 16 September 2011.

== Crew ==
Position	First part (May 2011)	Second part (June 2011 to September 2011)
Commander	Andrey Borisenko, RSA; First spaceflight	
Flight Engineer 1	Aleksandr Samokutyayev, RSA; First spaceflight	
Flight Engineer 2	Ron Garan, NASA; Second and last spaceflight	
Flight Engineer 3		Sergey Volkov, RSA; Second spaceflight
Flight Engineer 4		Mike Fossum, NASA; Third and last spaceflight
Flight Engineer 5		Satoshi Furukawa, JAXA; First spaceflight

Source
NASA

== Mission highlights ==
=== Soyuz TMA-20 undocking ===
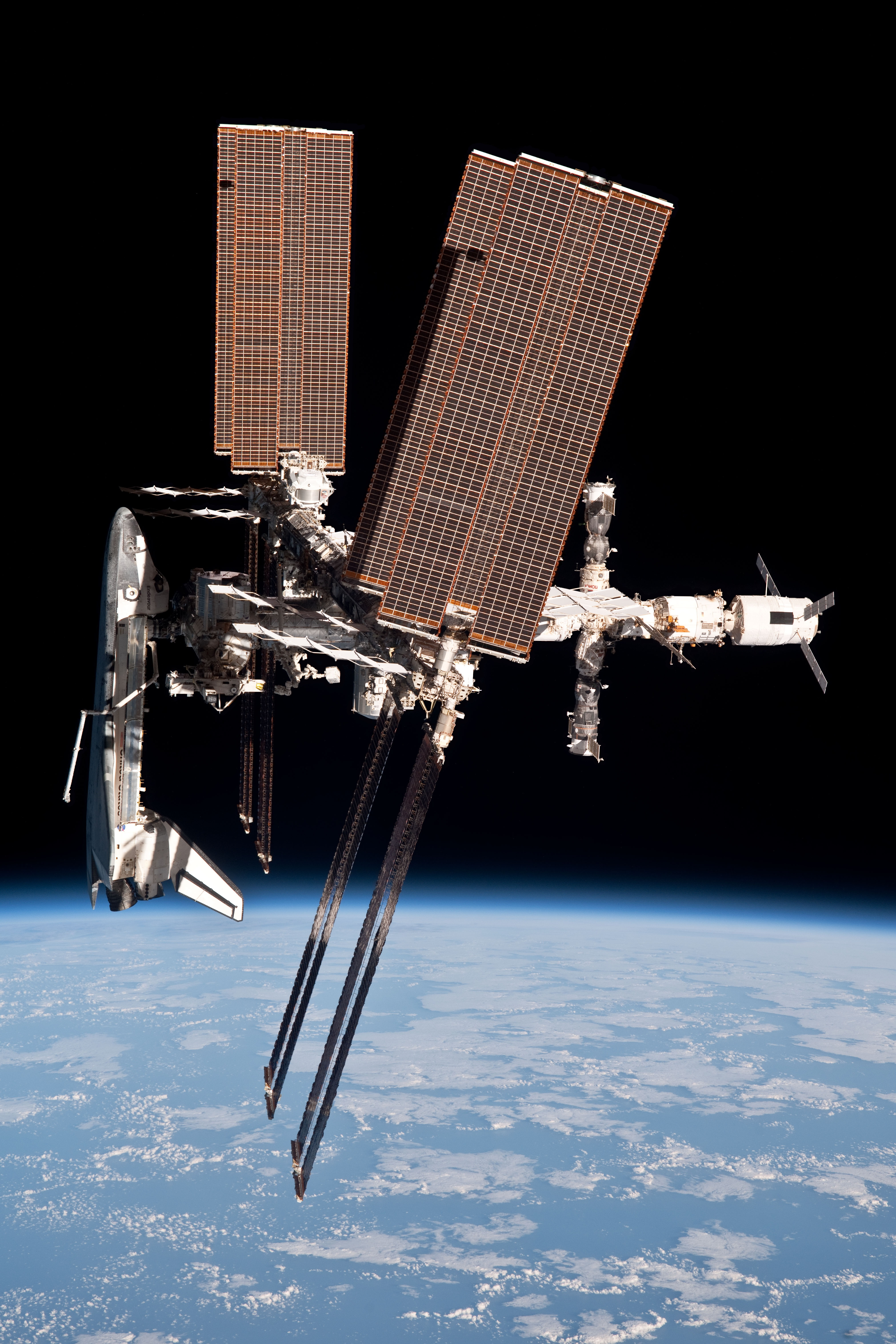
Space Shuttle Endeavour docked to the ISS on STS-134, imaged from the departing Soyuz TMA-20 spacecraft on 23 May 2011.

Expedition 28 began with the undocking and departure of the crew of Expedition 27 on 23 May 2011 at 21:35 UTC. The crew of Soyuz TMA-20 landed safely with Expedition 27 crew members Dmitri Kondratyev, Catherine Coleman and Paolo Nespoli aboard at 2:27 UTC on 24 May.

Before departing the vicinity of the International Space Station, the crew of TMA-20 photographed the exterior of the station during a fly-around, capturing photos of the Space Shuttle Endeavour docked with the ISS on its final mission, STS-134.

=== STS-134 ===
At the time Expedition 28 began, Space Shuttle Endeavour was docked to the ISS on her final mission, STS-134. During this mission, the crew of Endeavour installed on the station's exterior the Alpha Magnetic Spectrometer and several spare parts to aid in station operations after the retirement of the Space Shuttle. STS-134 was the 36th Space Shuttle mission to the International Space Station.

Endeavour and her crew, consisting of Mark Kelly, Gregory Johnson, Michael Fincke, Roberto Vittori, Andrew Feustel, and Gregory Chamitoff, returned to Earth on 1 June 2011, at 6:34 UTC. STS-134 was the second-to-last mission of the Space Shuttle.

=== Soyuz TMA-02M docking ===
The remainder of the Expedition 28 crew (Sergey Volkov, Michael E. Fossum, and Satoshi Furukawa) launched aboard Soyuz TMA-02M from the Baikonur Cosmodrome in Kazakhstan at 20:12 UTC on 7 June 2011. Originally scheduled to dock to the ISS on 9 June at approximately 21:22 UTC, the Soyuz did so several minutes early at 21:18.

=== Johannes Kepler ATV undocking ===
On 20 June 2011, the European Space Agency's robotic cargo ship Johannes Kepler disengaged from the ISS, having been docked since February 2011. On 21 June 2011, the ATV was deorbited, burning up in the atmosphere over the southern Pacific Ocean at around 22:44 CET.

=== Progress M-11M docking ===
A Russian Progress cargo ship, designated M-11M (Progress 42 or 42P by NASA) was launched on 21 June 2011 to resupply and deliver equipment to the International Space Station. Progress M-11M transferred more than 2.5 tons of cargo to the Space Station, including food, water, scientific hardware, propellant, and cargo. The cargo ship docked with the Zvezda service module of the Space Station at 16:37 UTC on 23 June 2011. The docking occurred 245 miles above eastern Kazakhstan.

=== STS-135—final space shuttle mission ===
On 8 July 2011, Space Shuttle Atlantis launched on the STS-135 mission, the final mission in NASA's Space Shuttle program. Atlantis docked to the ISS on 10 July 2011 at 15:07 UTC. The mission was crewed by NASA astronauts Christopher Ferguson, Douglas Hurley, Sandra Magnus, and Rex Walheim, and departed from the ISS on 19 July 2011. The purpose of the mission was to deliver the Raffaello MPLM, stocked with supplies, to the space station.

=== Soyuz TMA-21 undocking ===
The Soyuz TMA-21 spacecraft departed from the International Space Station on 16 September 2011 at 00:38 UTC. Soyuz Commander Aleksandr Samokutyayev and Flight Engineers Andrei Borisenko and Ronald Garan returned to Earth on 16 September at 03:59 UTC, landing safely in central Kazakhstan. Their landing marked the beginning of Expedition 29.

== Spacewalks ==
Mission	Spacewalkers	Start (UTC)	End (UTC)	Duration
Expedition 28; EVA 1	Michael Fossum; Ronald Garan	12 July 2011; 13:22	12 July 2011; 19:53	6 hours and 31 minutes
Expedition 28; Russian EVA #29	Sergey Volkov; Aleksandr Samokutyayev	3 August 2011; 14:50	3 August 2011; 21:13	6 hours and 23 minutes

== Gallery ==
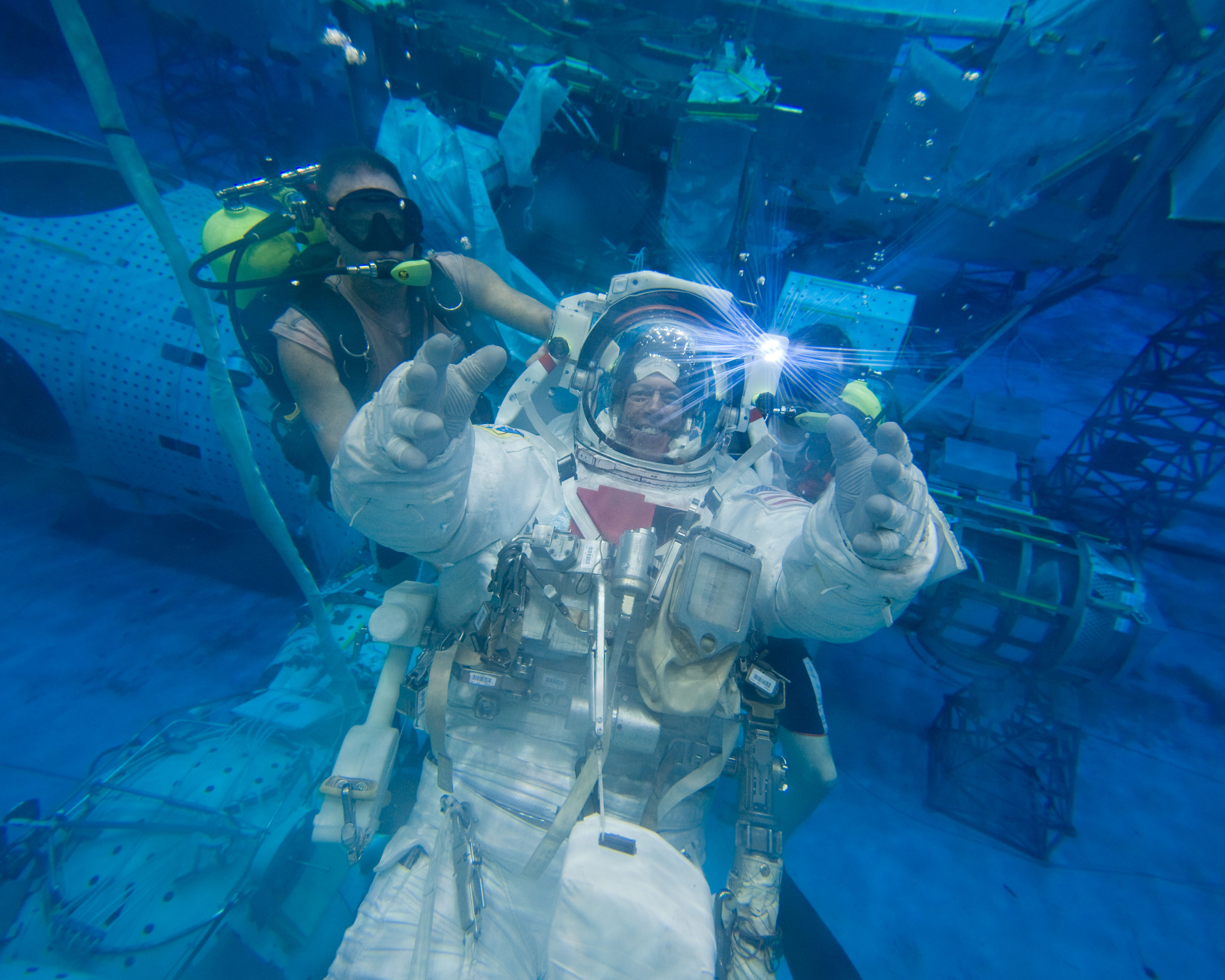
Fossum in a training version of his spacesuit, during a training session in the Neutral Buoyancy Laboratory near NASA's Johnson Space Center.

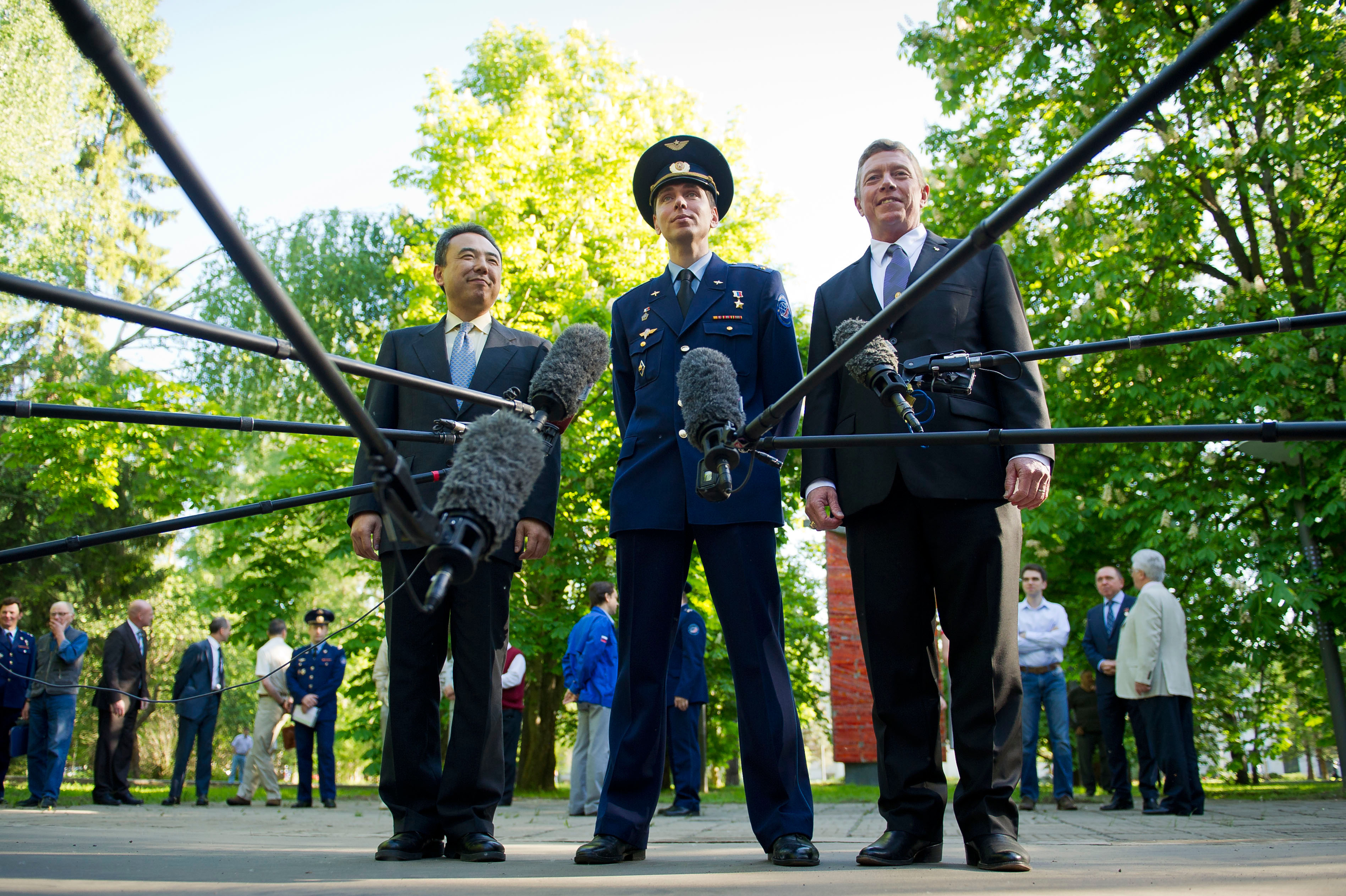
Furukawa (left) (Volkov (center), and Fossum answer reporters' questions during a press conference held on the grounds of the Gagarin Cosmonaut Training Center, in Star City, Russia.

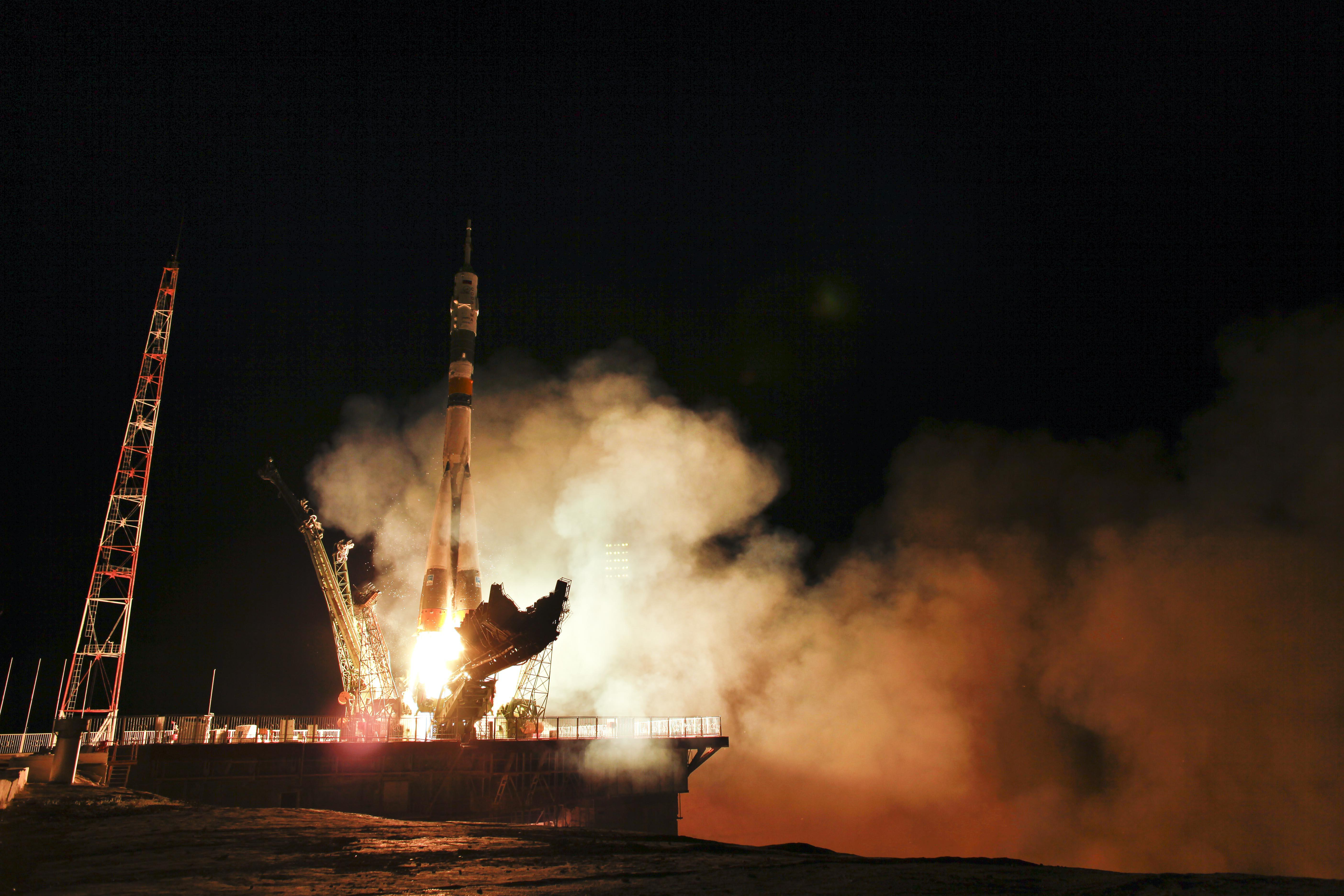
The Soyuz TMA-02M spacecraft launches on 8 June 2011.

Video of the aurora australis taken 17 September 2011 from 17:22:27 to 17:45:12 GMT, on an ascending pass from south of Madagascar to just north of Australia over the Indian Ocean

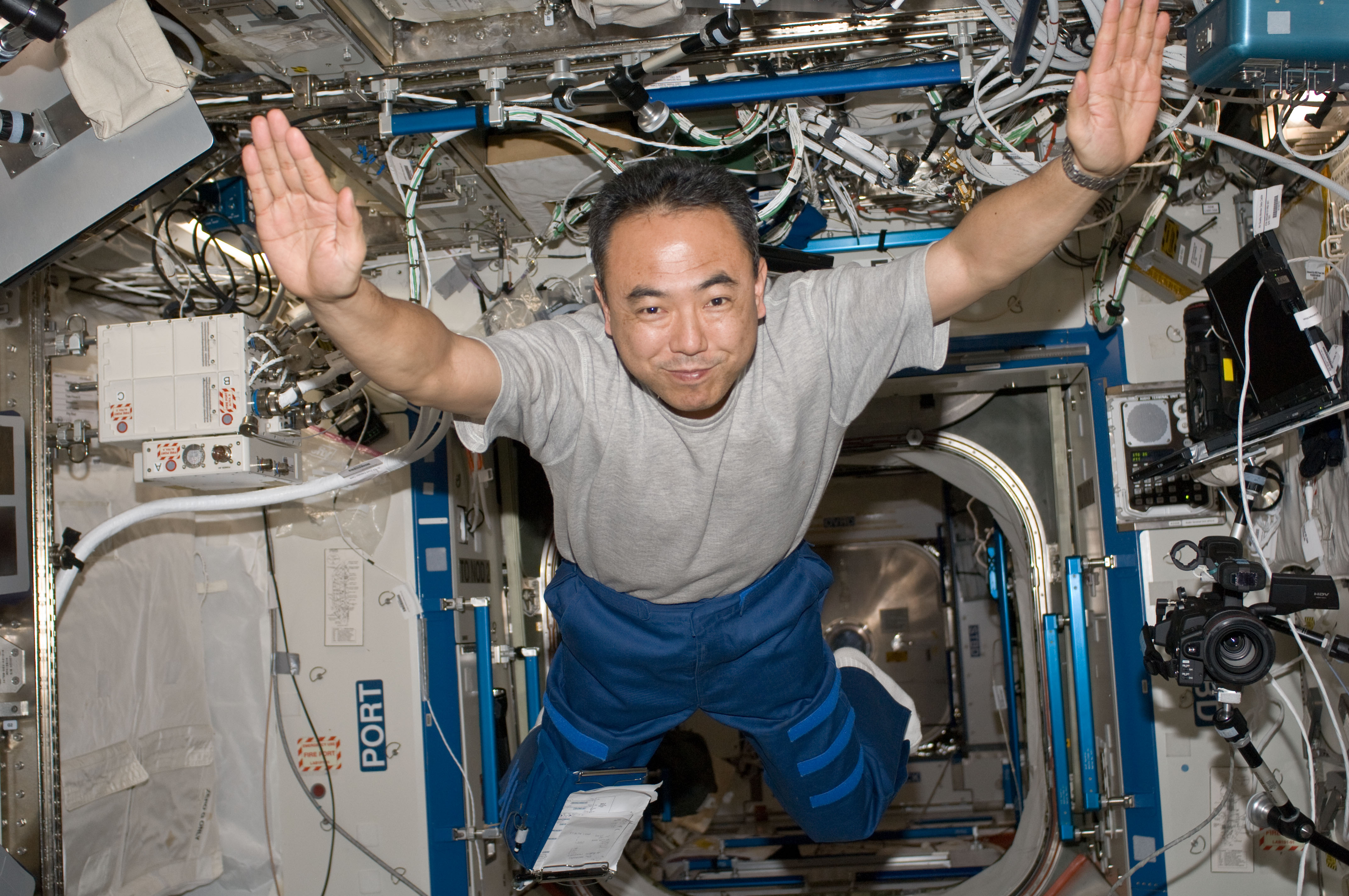
Furukawa aboard the ISS.

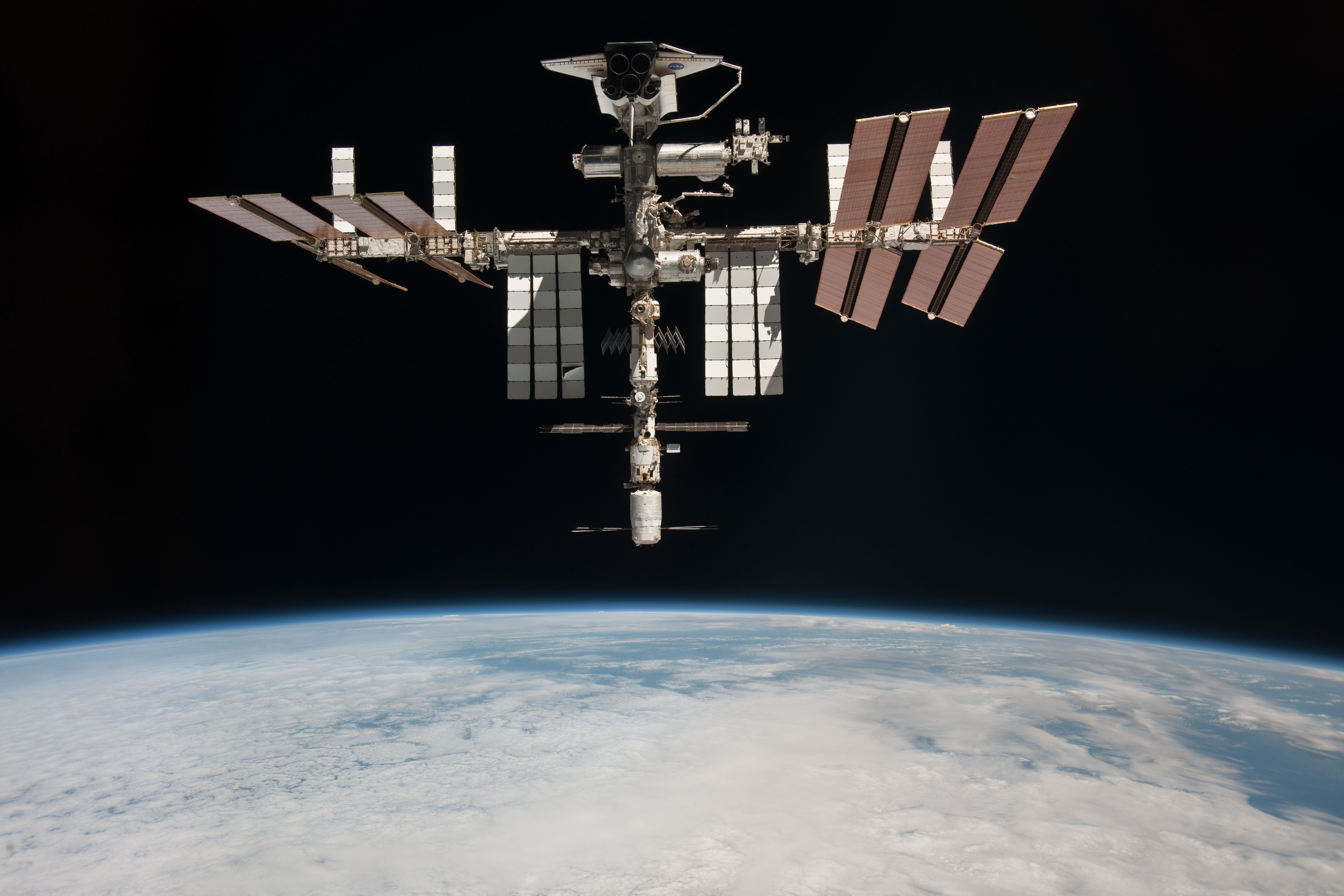
Photograph taken by the departing Expedition 27 crew of Endeavour docked to the ISS for the final time.

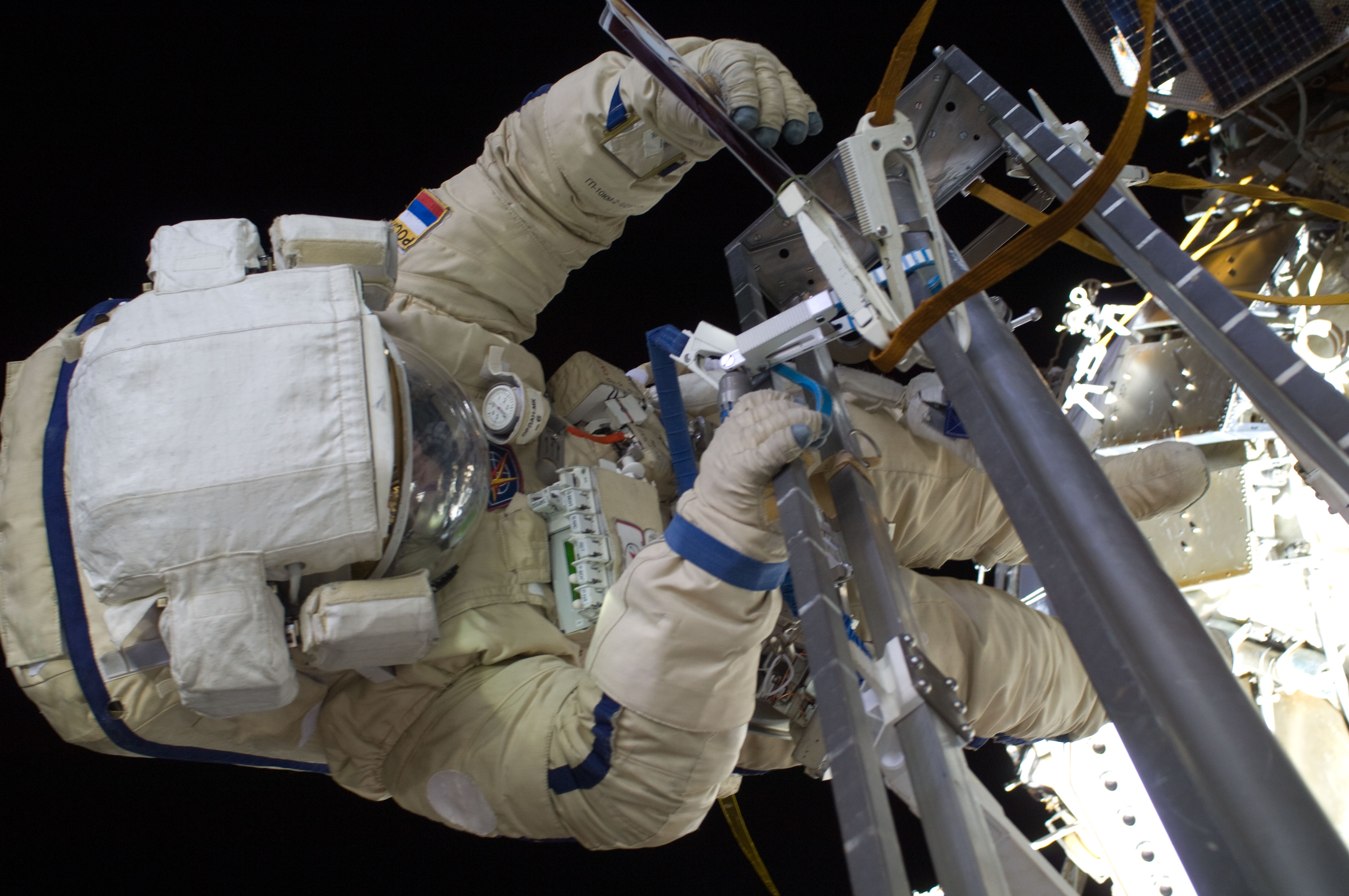
Volkov conducts a spacewalk.

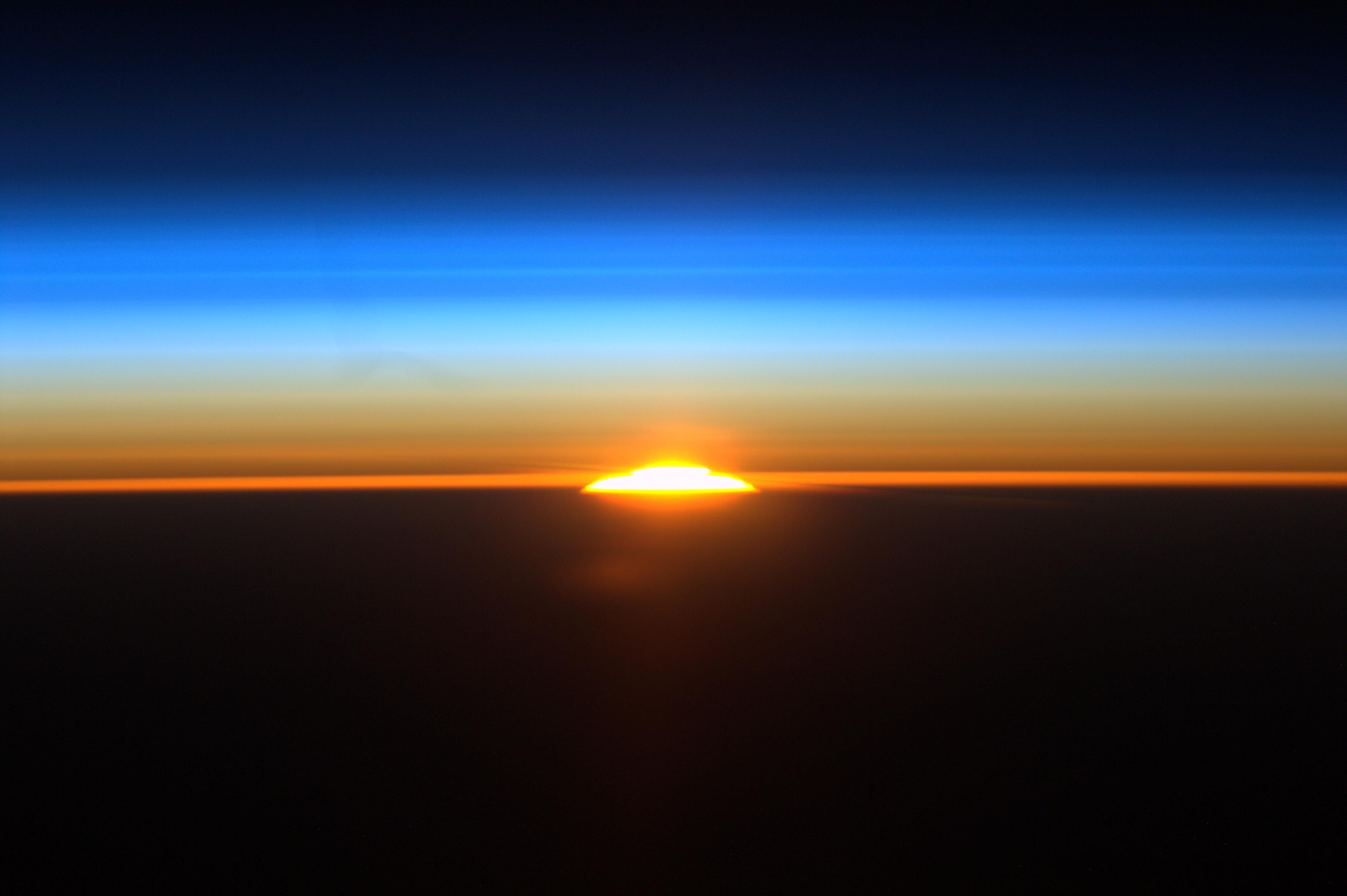
Image of an orbital sunrise taken by Garan.

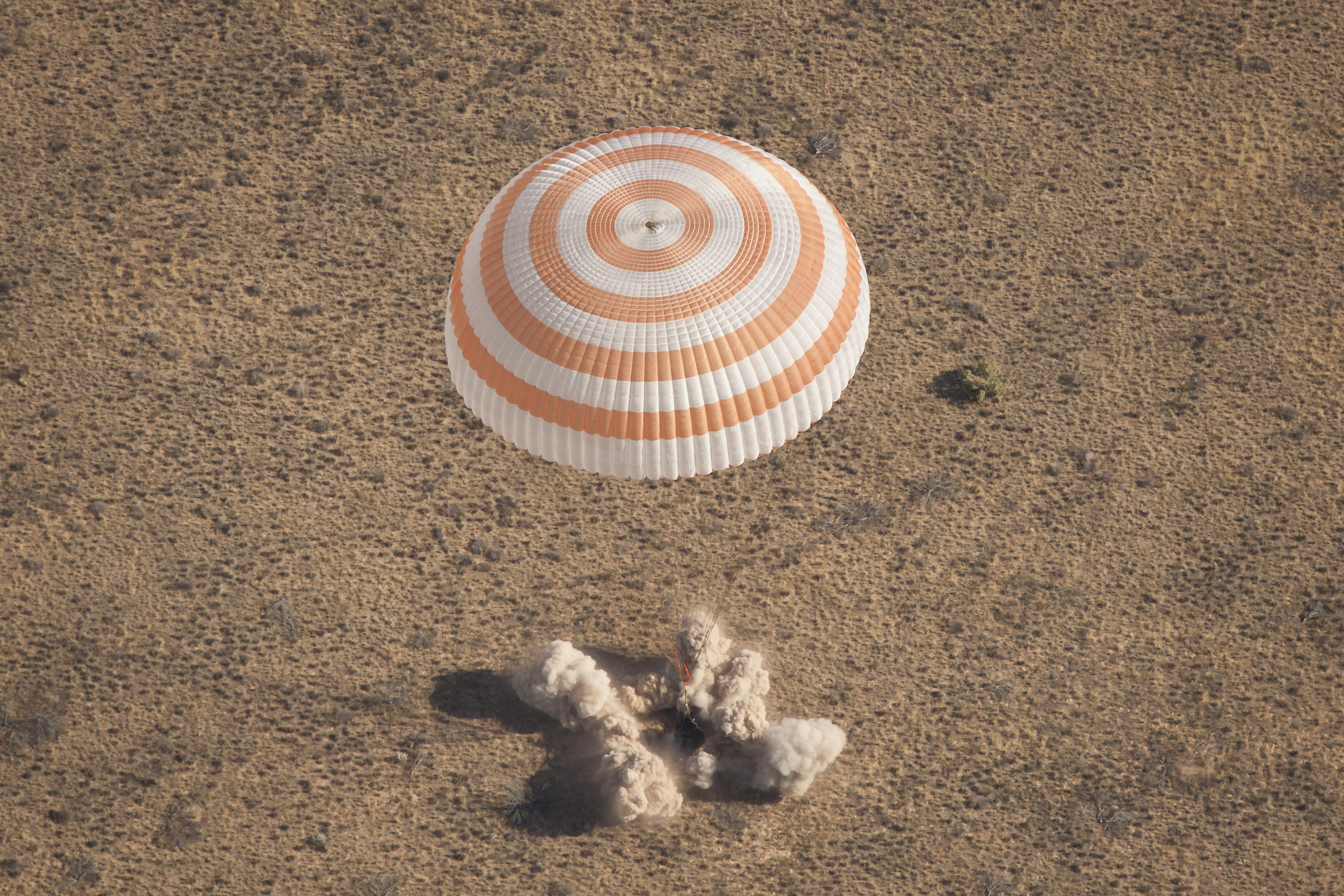
Expedition 28 lands.
