= Satoshi Furukawa =

Japanese surgeon and astronaut (born 1964)

- 古川 聡
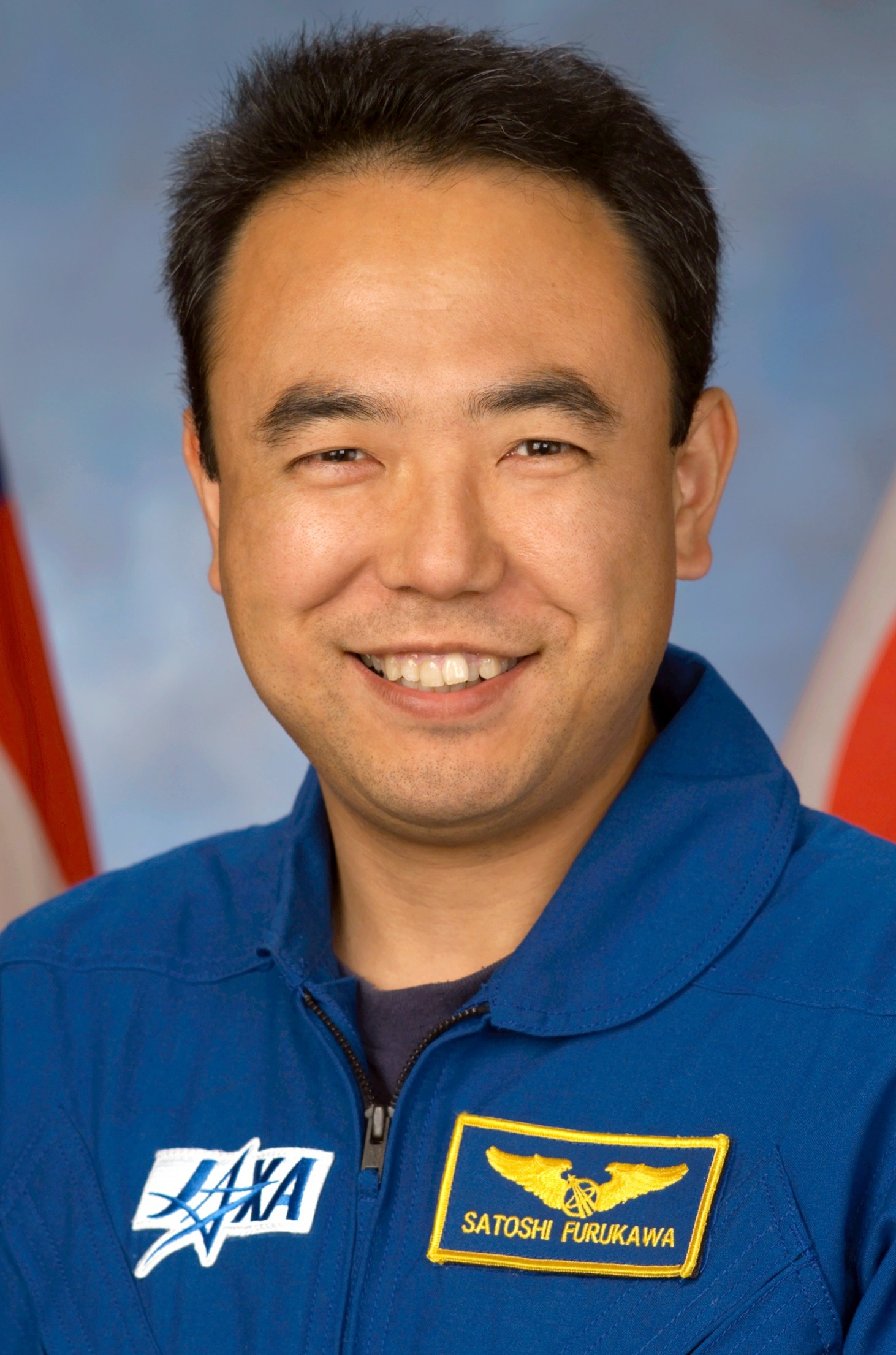
- Official portrait, 2004
- Born: April 4, 1964 (age 62); Yokohama, Japan
- Occupation: Surgeon
- Space career

NASDA/JAXA astronaut
- Time in space: 366 days, 8 hours 34 minutes
- Selection: 1999 NASDA Group
- Missions: Soyuz TMA-02M (Expedition 28/29); SpaceX Crew-7 (Expedition 69/70)
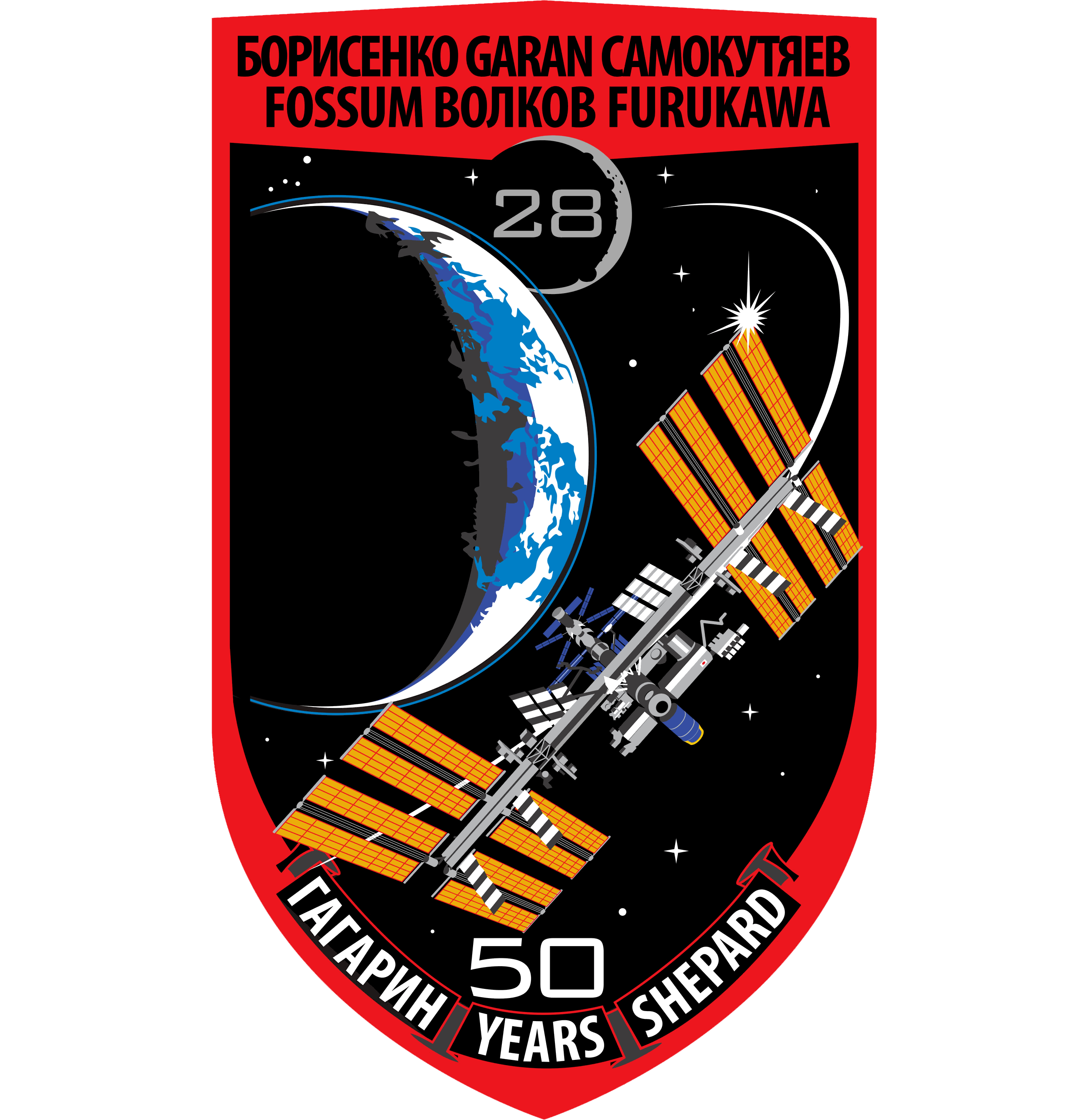
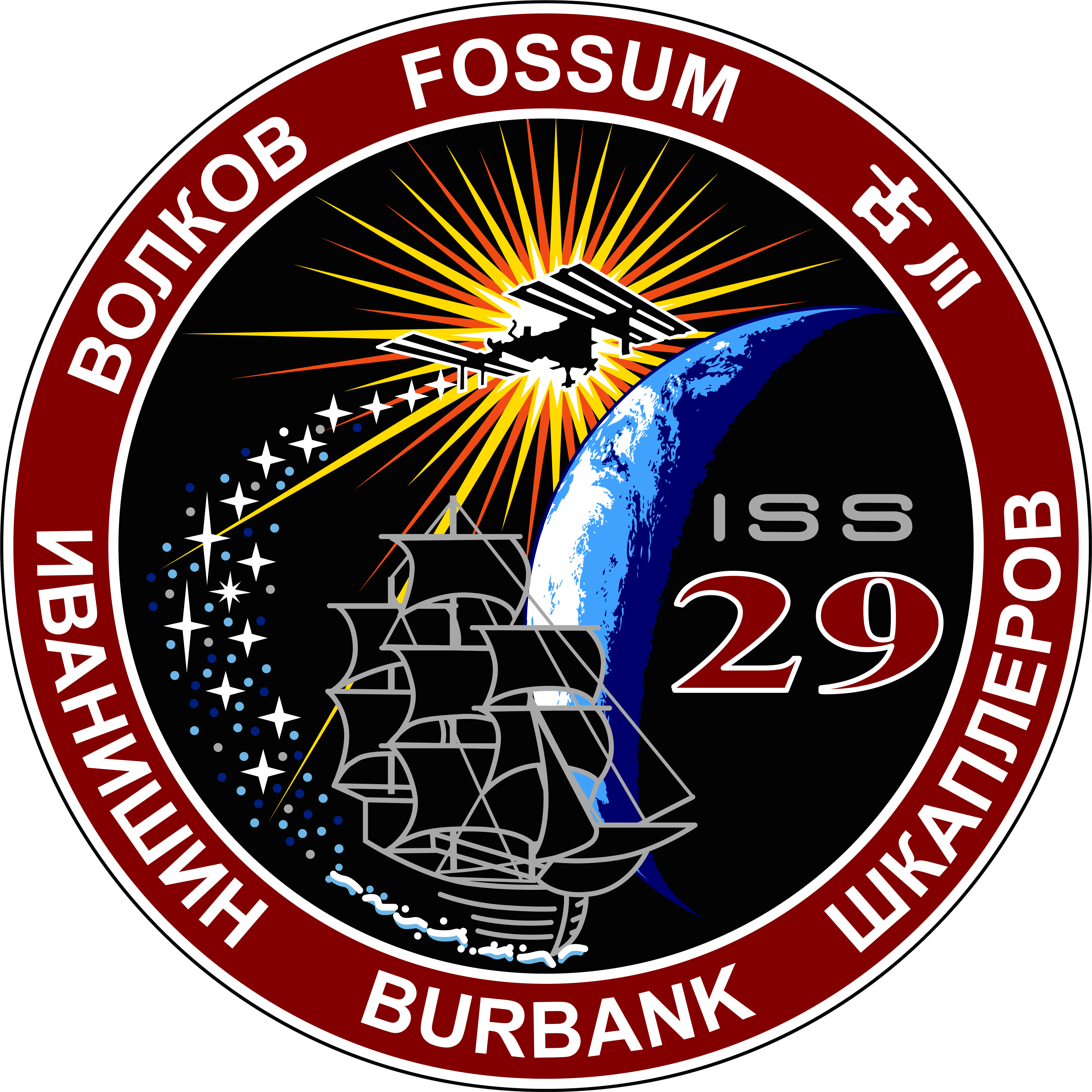
- Mission insignia
- Retired: March 31, 2026

Satoshi Furukawa (古川 聡, Furukawa Satoshi; born April 4, 1964) is a Japanese surgeon and retired JAXA astronaut. Furukawa was assigned to the International Space Station as a flight engineer on long-duration missions Expedition 28/29 (2011) and Expedition 69/70 (2023-2024).

== Medical career ==
Furakawa graduated from Eiko high school, Kamakura, in 1983; he received a Doctor of Medicine degree from the University of Tokyo in 1989, and a Doctor of Philosophy degree in Medical Science from the same in 2000.

From 1989 to 1999, Furukawa worked in the Department of Surgery at the University of Tokyo, as well as the Department of Anesthesiology at JR Tokyo General Hospital, the Department of Surgery at Ibaraki Prefectural Central Hospital, and at Sakuragaoka Hospital.

== NASDA/JAXA career ==
In February 1999, Furukawa was selected by the National Space Development Agency of Japan (NASDA) as one of three Japanese astronaut candidates for the International Space Station (ISS). He started the ISS Astronaut Basic Training program in April 1999 and was certified as an astronaut in January 2001.

Since April 2001, he has been participating in ISS Advanced Training, as well as supporting the development of the hardware and operation of the Japanese ISS Experimental Module Kibō.

On October 1, 2003, NASDA merged with ISAS (Institute of Space and Astronautical Science) and NAL (National Aerospace Laboratory of Japan) and was renamed JAXA (Japan Aerospace Exploration Agency).

In May 2004, he completed Soyuz-TMA Flight Engineer-1 training at the Yuri Gagarin Cosmonaut Training Center (GCTC), Star City, Russia.

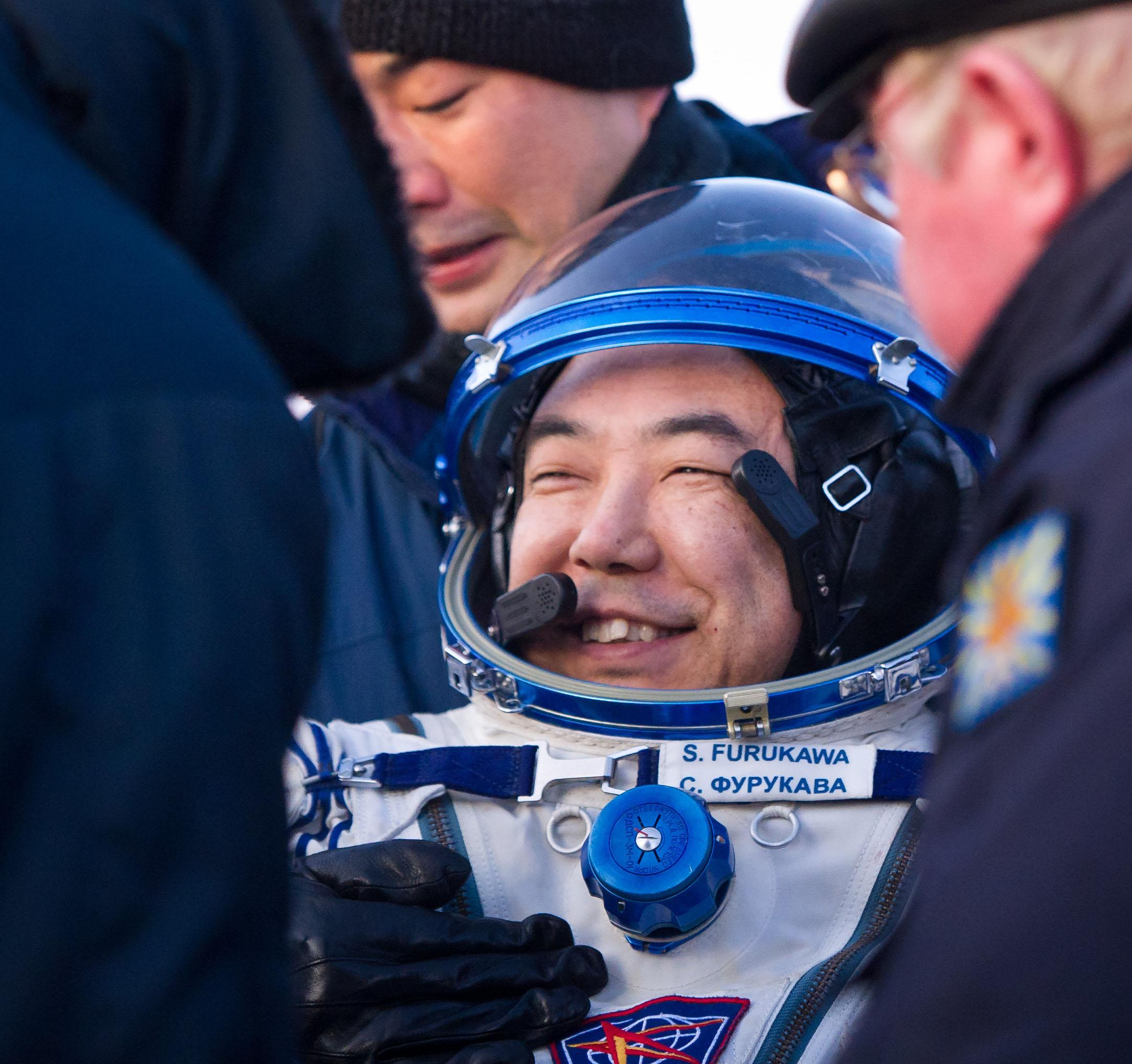
Furukawa after landing of Soyuz TMA-02M spacecraft in Kazakhstan.

Furukawa arrived at the Johnson Space Center in June 2004. In February 2006, he completed NASA Astronaut Candidate Training that included scientific and technical briefings, intensive instruction in Shuttle and International Space Station systems, physiological training, T-38 Talon flight training, and water and wilderness survival training. Completion of this initial training qualified him for various technical assignments within the NASA Astronaut Office and for flight assignment as a mission specialist on Space Shuttle missions.

In August 2007, Furukawa served as an aquanaut during the NEEMO 13 project, an exploration research mission held in Aquarius, the world's only undersea research laboratory.

In 2013, Furukawa served as cavenaut into the ESA CAVES training in Sardinia, alongside Jeremy Hansen, Michael Barratt, Jack Fisher, Aleksei Ovchinin, and Paolo Nespoli.

== Spaceflight experience ==
Furukawa was assigned as a flight engineer to the International Space Station Expedition 28/29 long duration missions. The Soyuz TMA-02M spacecraft carrying Furukawa, cosmonaut Sergey Volkov and NASA astronaut Michael Fossum lifted off from the Baikonour Cosmodrome on June 7, 2011. Carrying the same crew, Soyuz TMA-02M undocked from the ISS at 11:00 pm UTC on November 21, 2011. The spacecraft soft-landed safely—albeit on its side—in Kazakhstan at 2:26 am UTC on November 22.

In 2023-2024, he completed a second long-duration flight to the ISS as a mission specialist on Expedition 69/70, lifting off on the Crew-7 mission of a SpaceX Crew Dragon on August 26, 2023 from NASA’s Kennedy Space Center in Florida and returning to Earth on March 12, 2024.

Furukawa announced his retirement from JAXA on March 31, 2026.

== Controversies ==
In 2016 and 2017, Furukawa was overseeing a two-week-long spaceflight analog mission in Tsukuba, a city northeast of Tokyo. 40 participants were confined to closed environments to simulate what astronauts experience during spaceflight, and their stress levels and mental well-being were to be assessed by two researchers. The researchers fabricated research data, compiling psychological assessments without actually conducting interviews and rewriting participant diagnoses. They also claimed that three researchers had conducted the interviews when there were only two. In November 2020, JAXA began investigating the research results and subsequently suspended the 190 million yen ($1.4 million) experiment. Furukawa was officially reprimanded by JAXA due to his role as project supervisor. However, since he was not personally involved in fabricating the data, Furukawa was allowed to remain on the current ISS mission in 2023.

== Personal ==
Furukawa was born in Yokohama, Kanagawa, Japan. He enjoys baseball, bowling, music, and traveling. He is married and has two children.
