= Ronald J. Garan Jr. =

American astronaut (born 1961)

Ronald Garan
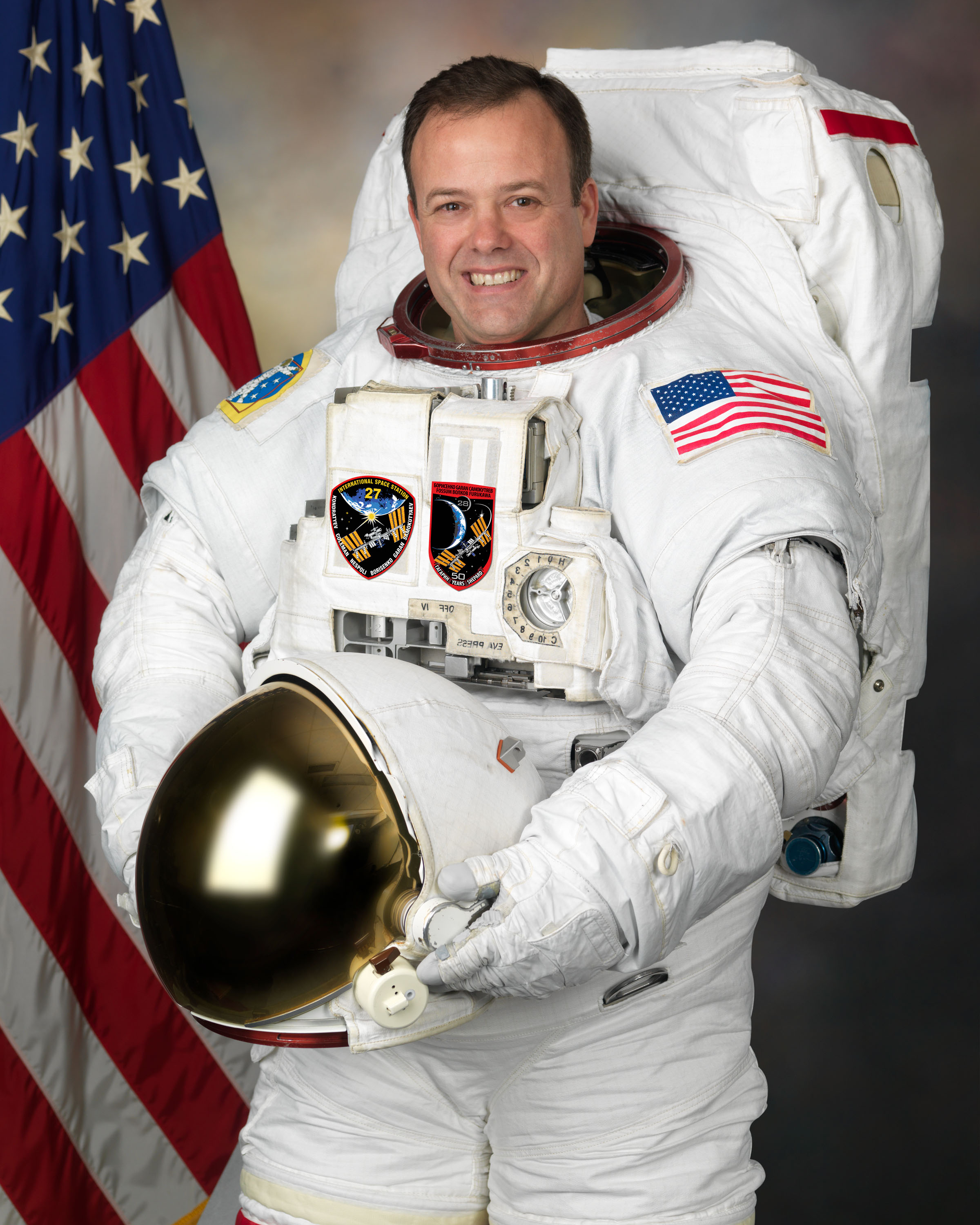
- Born: Ronald John Garan Jr. October 30, 1961 (age 65); Yonkers, New York, U.S.
- Education: State University of New York, Oneonta (BS); Embry-Riddle Aeronautical University (MS); University of Florida (MS)
- Space career

NASA astronaut
- Rank: Colonel, USAF
- Time in space: 177d 23h 54m
- Selection: NASA Group 18 (2000)
- Total EVAs: 4
- Total EVA time: 27h 3m
- Missions: STS-124; Soyuz TMA-21 (Expedition 27/28)
- Retired: December 2012

Ronald John Garan Jr. (born October 30, 1961) is an American retired NASA astronaut. After graduating from State University of New York College at Oneonta in 1982, he joined the Air Force, becoming a Second Lieutenant in 1984. He became an F-16 pilot, and flew combat missions in Desert Shield and Desert Storm. Before becoming an astronaut he was the Operations Officer of the 40th Flight Test Squadron (FTS). He first flew in space as a mission specialist on the May 2008 STS-124 mission to the International Space Station (ISS). He returned to ISS on April 4, 2011, for a six-month stay as a member of Expedition 27. Garan is a highly decorated former NASA astronaut who flew on the US Space Shuttle, Russian Soyuz, and International Space Station. In total he spent 178 days in space and more than 71 million miles in 2,842 orbits of Earth, 27 hours and 3 minutes of EVA in four spacewalks, and 18 days on the bottom of the ocean during the NEEMO-9 undersea mission.

== Personal ==
Born on October 30, 1961, in Yonkers, New York, Ron Garan is of Russian Jewish descent. He is married to Carmel Courtney. They have three sons.

His father, Ronald Garan Sr., resides in Yonkers with his wife Yisela Garan. His mother, Linda Lichtblau, resides in Port St. Lucie, Florida, with her husband, Peter Lichtblau.

His description of coming back to Earth in a Soyuz capsule was "like going over Niagara Falls in a barrel (that's on fire) followed by a high speed crash".

Garan serves on the advisory council of Represent.Us, a nonpartisan anti-corruption organization and is on the Board of Advisors or Board of Directors of the following organizations:

- Constellation Foundation (Chair)
- Desert Oasis Inc. (Chair)
- Manna Energy Foundation (Chair)
- New Epoch Publishing (Chair)
- Space for Humanity
- Titan Space Technology Corporation
- Urban Sky Theory Inc. DBA Urban Sky
- Adventure Headquarters
- Sweet Sense Inc. DBA Verridy

== Education ==
Garan graduated from Roosevelt High School in Yonkers, New York in 1979. He earned a Bachelor of Science degree in business economics from the State University of New York College at Oneonta in 1982, a Master of Aeronautical Science degree from Embry-Riddle Aeronautical University in 1994, and a Master of Science degree in aerospace engineering from the University of Florida in 1996.

== Organizations ==
- Society of Experimental Test Pilots
- Engineers Without Borders
- Founder of the Manna Energy Foundation
- International Solar Energy Society
- Writer and mentor for Unreasonable.is since September 2013, a social entrepreneurship hub founded by Daniel A. Epstein

Garan is the founder of the Fragile Oasis project, aimed at further integrating space and planetary sciences and the promotion of user projects "connecting space and Earth". He is also the vice president of Spaceship Earth Grants, whose mission is to make space more accessible through human spaceflight and parabolic flight awards to individual applicants.

== Awards and honors ==
Garan's military decorations include the Distinguished Flying Cross for Combat Valor, Meritorious Service Medal, Air Medal, Aerial Achievement Medal, Air Force Outstanding Unit Award with Valor, National Defense Service Medal, Humanitarian Service Award, Kuwait Liberation Medal, NASA Superior Accomplishment Award, NASA Exceptional Achievement Medal, and various other service awards. He received the Distinguished Graduate and Top Academic Award USAF Fighter Weapons School; was twice selected as Top Academic Instructor Pilot: USAF Weapons School; USAF Weapons School and USAF Weapons and Tactics Center: Lt. Gen. Claire Lee Chennault Award; Distinguished Graduate Squadron Officers School; Top Academic Award F-16 Replacement Training Unit (RTU). He received an honorary Doctor of Science degree from the State University of New York.

== Military career ==
Garan received his commission as a Second Lieutenant in the United States Air Force from the Air Force Officer Training School at Lackland Air Force Base, Texas, in 1984. Upon completion, he attended Undergraduate Pilot Training (UPT) at Vance AFB, Oklahoma and earned his wings in 1985. He then completed F-16 training at Luke Air Force Base, Arizona and reported to Hahn Air Base in former West Germany where he served as a combat ready F-16 pilot in the 496th Tactical Fighter Squadron (TFS), from 1986 to 1988. In March 1988, he was reassigned to the 17th TFS, Shaw Air Force Base, South Carolina, where he served as an instructor pilot, evaluator pilot, and combat ready F-16 pilot. While stationed at Shaw he attended the USAF Fighter Weapons School, graduating in 1989, and then returned to the 17th TFS to assume the position of Squadron Weapons Officer. From August 1990 through March 1991, he deployed to Southwest Asia in support of Operations Desert Shield/Desert Storm where he flew combat missions in the F-16.

In 1991, Garan was reassigned to the USAF Weapons School, where he served as an F-16 Weapons School instructor pilot, flight commander and assistant operations officer. In 1994, he was reassigned to the 39th Flight Test Squadron (39th FTS), Eglin Air Force Base, Florida, where he served as a developmental test pilot and chief F-16 pilot. Garan attended the U.S. Naval Test Pilot School at the Naval Air Station Patuxent River, Maryland, from January to December 1997, after which he was reassigned to the 39th FTS, Eglin Air Force Base, where he served as the director of the Joint Air to Surface Standoff Missile Combined Test Force. Garan was the operations officer of the 40th Flight Test Squadron when he was selected as an astronaut for NASA. He has logged over 5,000 hours in more than thirty different aircraft.

On June 1, 2009, Garan retired from the Air Force.

== NASA career ==
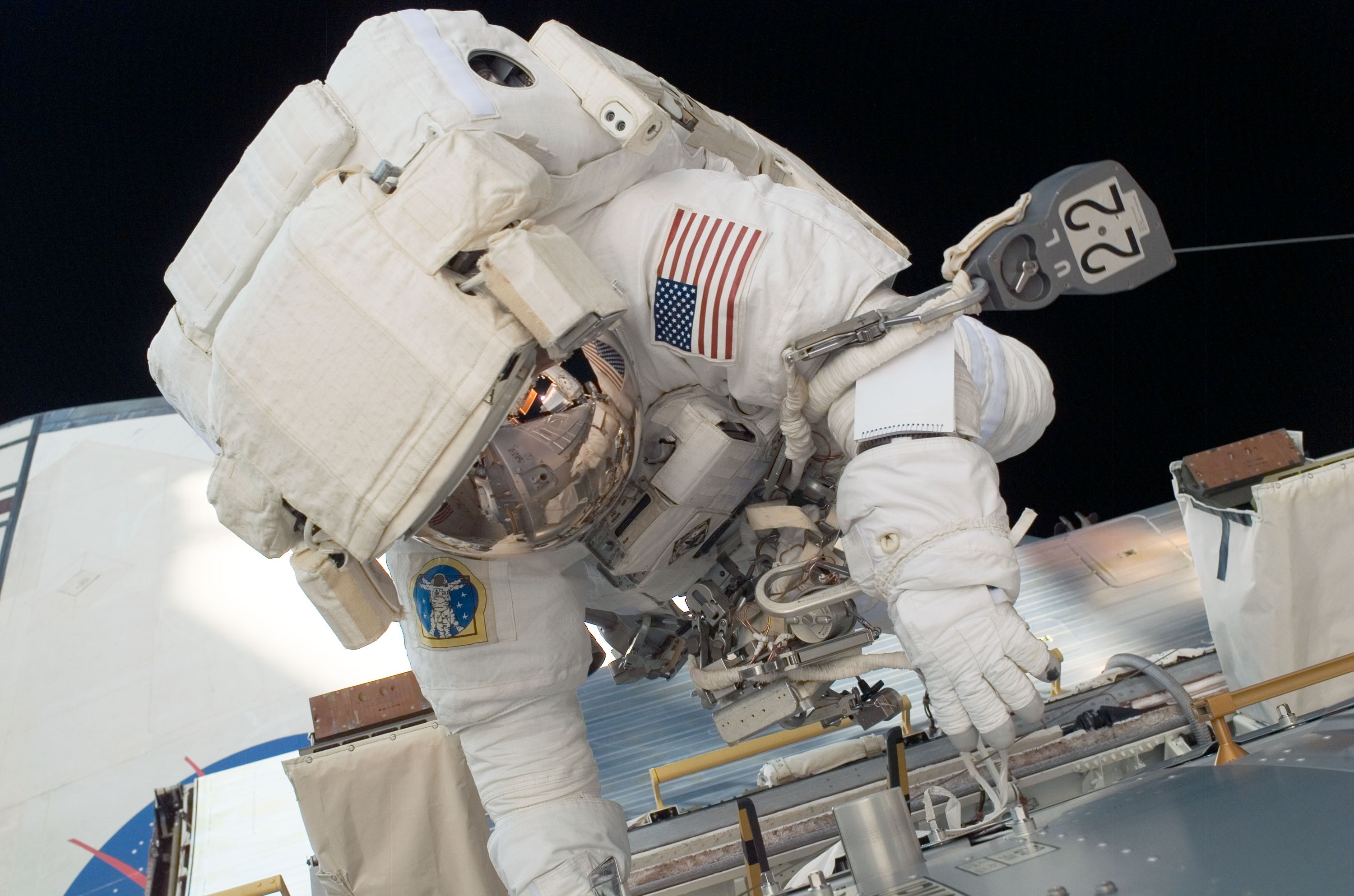
Garan participates in the first spacewalk of the STS-124 mission.

Selected as a pilot by NASA in July 2000, Colonel Garan reported for training in August 2000. Following the completion of two years of training and evaluation, he was assigned technical duties in the Astronaut Office Station and Shuttle Operations Branches.

In April 2006, Garan became an aquanaut through his participation in the joint NASA-National Oceanic and Atmospheric Administration, NEEMO 9 (NASA Extreme Environment Mission Operations) project, an exploration research mission held in Aquarius, the world's only undersea research laboratory. During this eighteen-day mission, the six-person crew of NEEMO 9 developed lunar surface exploration procedures and telemedical technology applications in support of the United States' Vision for Space Exploration. Ron Garan completed his first space flight in 2008 on STS-124 as mission specialist 2 for ascent and entry, and has logged over 13 days in space and 27 hours and 3 minutes of EVA in four spacewalks.

== Spaceflight experience ==
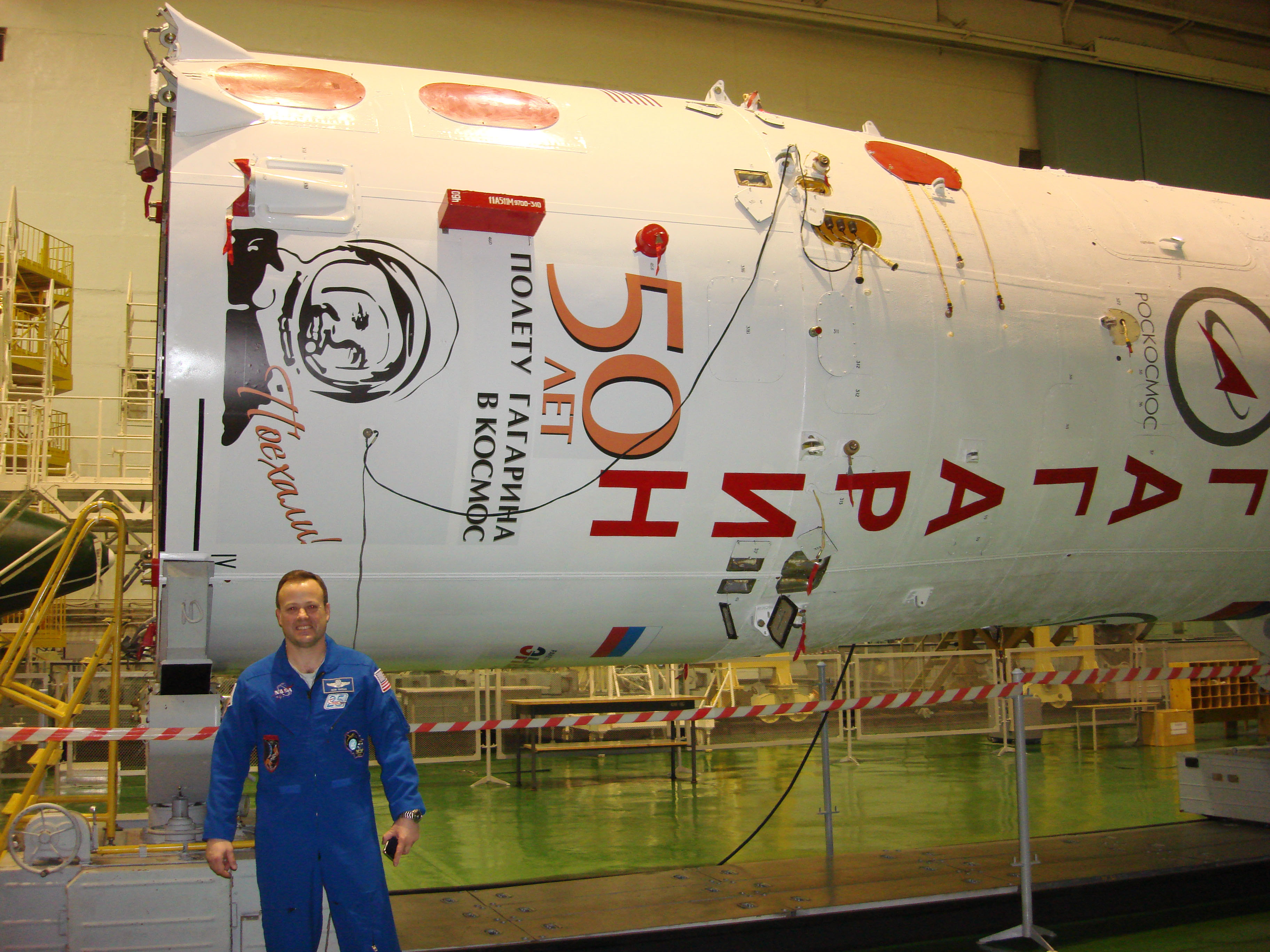
Garan stands in front of the Soyuz TMA-21 booster which carried him to space in April 2011.

- STS-124 Discovery (May 31 to June 14, 2008) was the 123rd Space Shuttle flight, and the 26th Shuttle flight to the International Space Station. STS-124 was launched from the Kennedy Space Center in Cape Canaveral, Florida, and docked with the International Space Station on June 2 to deliver the Japanese Experiment Module Pressurized Module (JEM-PM) and the Japanese Remote Manipulator System. During the nine days docked to the space station, the STS-124 Shuttle astronauts delivered the 37-foot (11-meter) Kibo lab and moved the Logistics Module to its permanent home on the top of the JEM-PM. Garan accumulated 20 hours and 32 minutes of Extra-vehicular activity time in three spacewalks required to maintain the station and to prime the new Japanese module's robotic arm.

STS-124 also delivered a new station crew member, Expedition 17 Flight Engineer Greg Chamitoff. He replaced Expedition 16 Flight Engineer Garrett Reisman, who returned to Earth with the STS-124 crew. The STS-124 mission was completed in 218 orbits, traveling 5,735,643 miles in 13 days, 18 hours, 13 minutes and 7 seconds.

- Ron Garan's second mission was as a crew member on Expedition 27/28. His Soyuz TMA-21 launch craft was named Gagarin in honor of the 50th anniversary, eight days after its launch on April 4, of the first human spaceflight by Yuri Gagarin. Garan participated in the last space-shuttle-based spacewalk during the STS-135 mission, accumulating an additional 6 hours and 31 minutes of Extra-vehicular activity time. He returned to Earth aboard TMA-21 on September 16, 2011.

The Soyuz TMA-21 "Gagarin" descent module is in permanent exhibition at the German Titov Museum in Polkovnikovo, Altai Kray, Siberia.

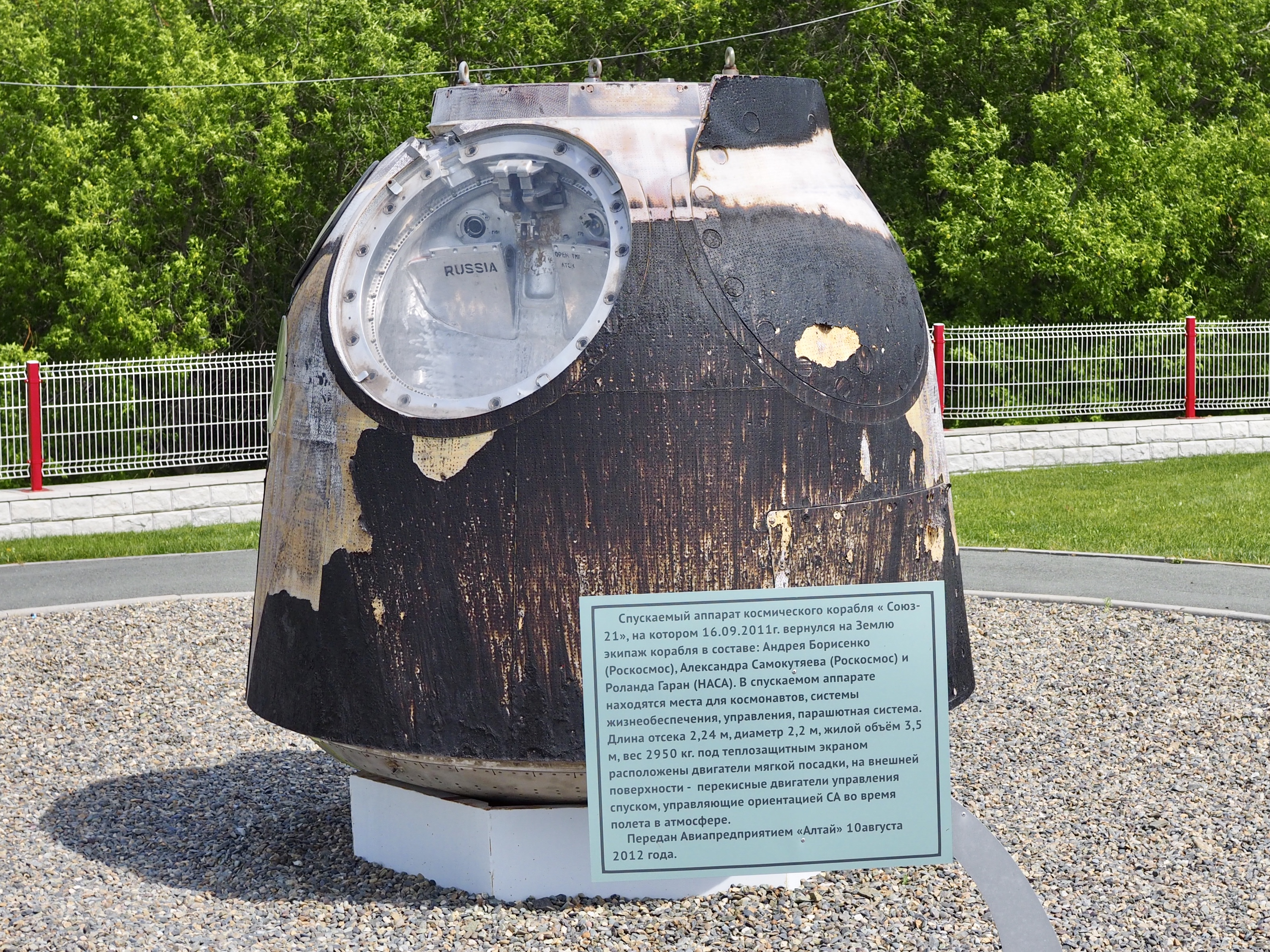
Soyuz descent module

== Spirituality ==
Before his flight aboard Discovery in 2008, Garan asked the religious women of a Carmelite community in New Caney, Texas, for their prayers and told them he could take an item into space for them. The sisters gave him relics of St. Thérèse of Lisieux and quoted her words:

I have the vocation of the Apostle. I would like to travel over the whole earth to preach Your Name and to plant Your glorious Cross on infidel soil. But O my Beloved, one mission alone would not be sufficient for me, I would want to preach the Gospel on all the five continents simultaneously and even to the most remote isles. I would be a missionary, not for a few years only but from the beginning of creation until the consummation of the ages.

Garan is the founder of the Manna Energy Foundation, which is assisting the villages of Rwanda to make potable water.

On June 24, 2009, Garan met Pope Benedict XVI at his general audience.

== Post-NASA career ==
In 2014, Garan retired from NASA to work on communicating what he called the "Orbital Perspective". He has published a book called The Orbital Perspective - Lessons in Seeing the Big Picture from a Journey of 71 Million Miles and is working on a documentary called Orbital.

On February 23, 2016, World View Enterprises has announced that Ron Garan will be chief pilot for current robotic flight operations and upcoming human spaceflights via balloon.

== Awards and decorations ==
Air Force

Distinguished Flying Cross with Valor device
Meritorious Service Medal with two bronze oak leaf clusters
Air Medal
Aerial Achievement Medal
Air Force Outstanding Unit Award with Valor device
National Defense Service Medal with bronze service star
Humanitarian Service Medal
Air Force Longevity Service Award with silver oak leaf cluster
Air Force Training Ribbon
Kuwait Liberation Medal (Kuwait)

NASA

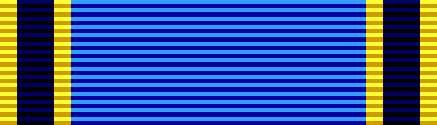
NASA Exceptional Service Medal
NASA Space Flight Medal with bronze oak leaf cluster
