= Aleksandr Samokutyaev =

Russian cosmonaut (1970–2026)

Alexander Samokutyaev
- Александр Самокутяев
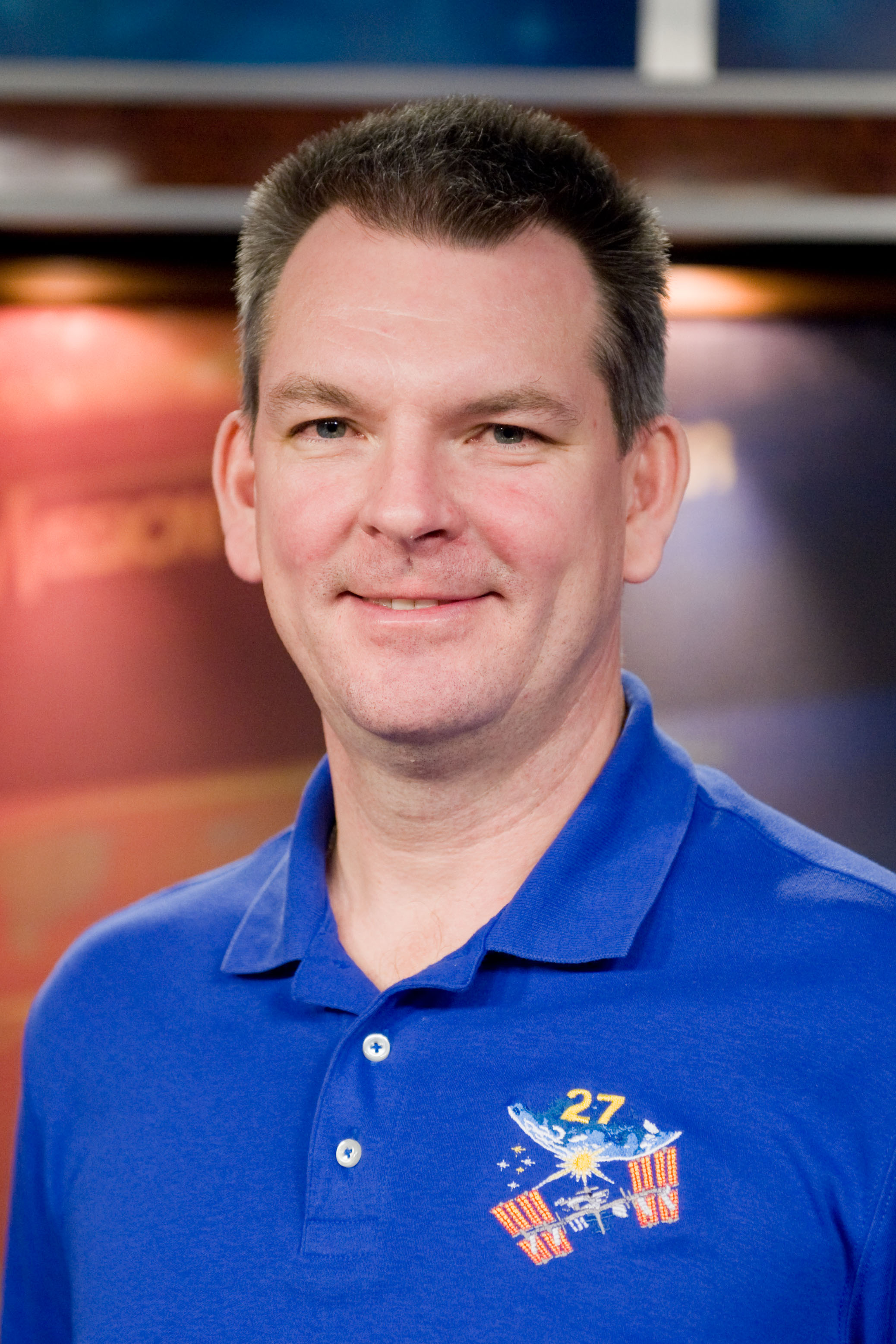
- Samokutyayev in 2011

Member of the State Duma for Penza Oblast
- In office 23 September 2020 – 17 June 2026
- Preceded by: Leonid Levin
- Constituency: Lermontovsky (No. 147)

Personal details
- Born: 13 March 1970 Penza, Russian SFSR, USSR
- Died: 17 June 2026 (aged 56)
- Party: United Russia (from 2021); A Just Russia (until 2021)
- Spouse: Oksana Nikolaevna
- Children: 1
- Education: Chernigov Higher Military Aviation School; Gagarin Air Force Academy; RANEPA
- Occupation: Pilot
- Space career

Roscosmos cosmonaut
- Rank: Colonel
- Time in space: 331d 11h 25m
- Selection: 2003 TsPK Group
- Total EVAs: 2
- Total EVA time: 10h 1m
- Missions: Soyuz TMA-21 (Expedition 27/28), Soyuz TMA-14M (Expedition 41/42)
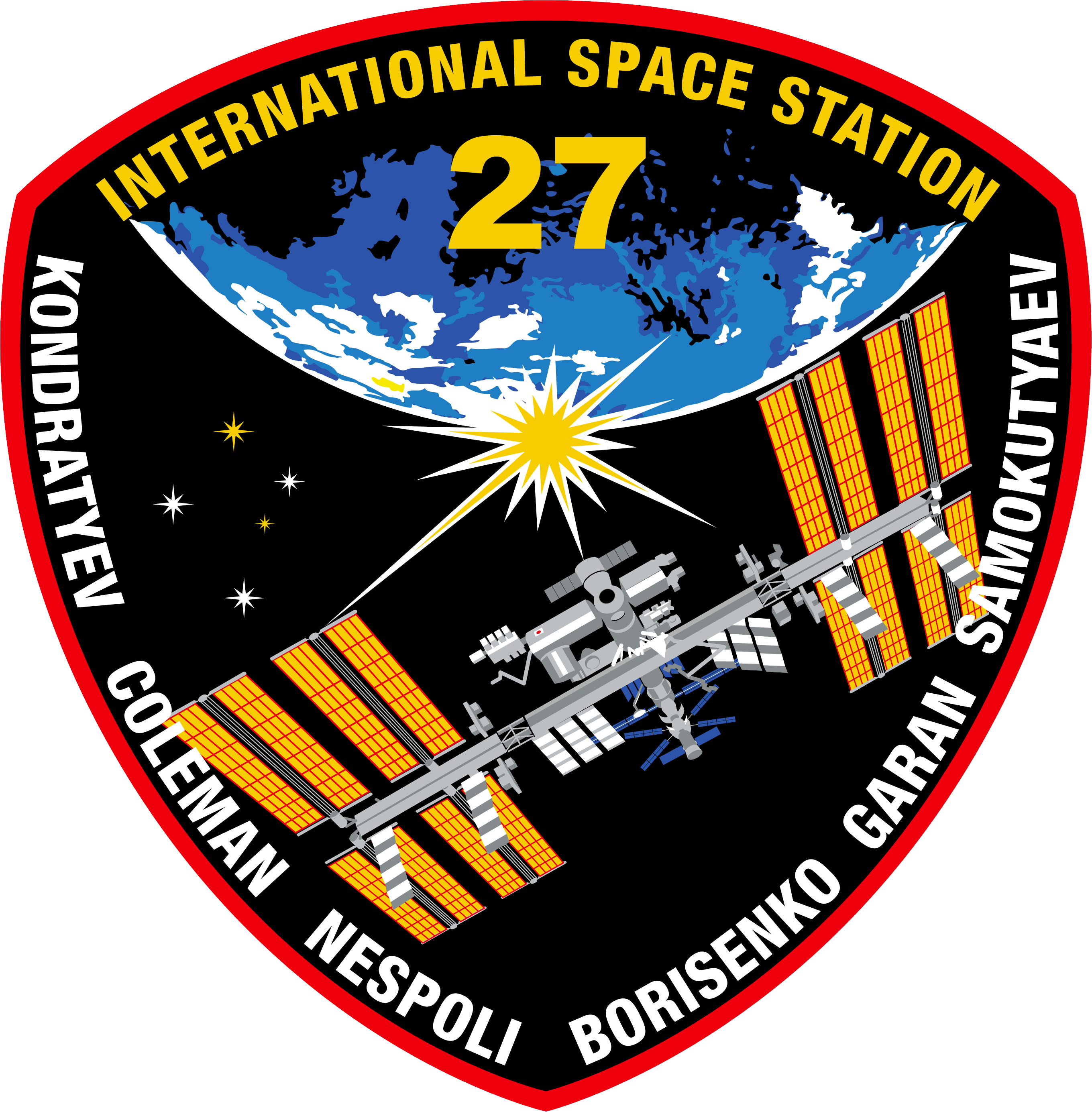
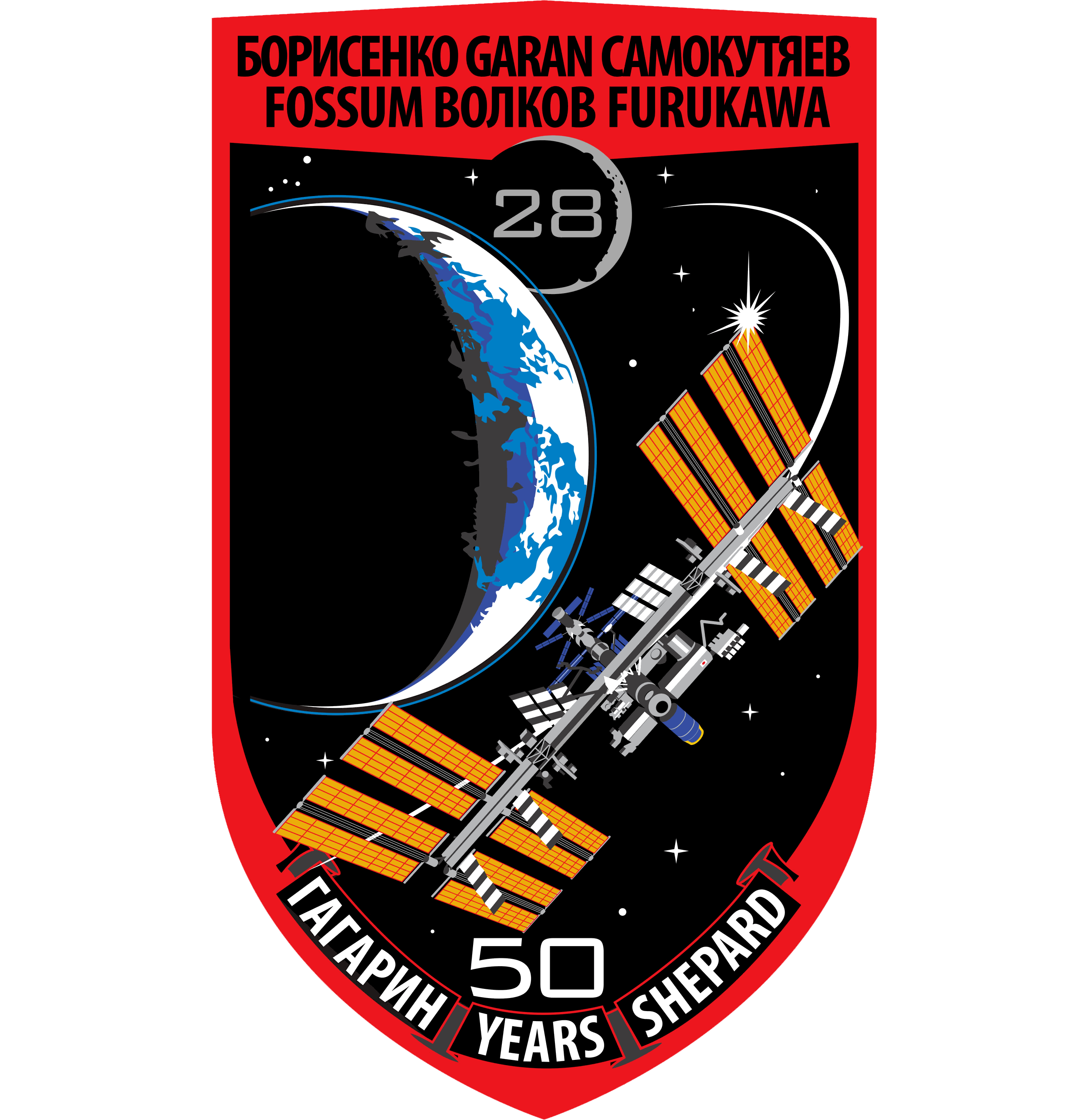
- Mission insignia
- Retired: April 21, 2017

Aleksandr Mikhailovich Samokutyaev (Russian: Александр Михайлович Самокутяев; 1970 – 17 June 2026) was a Russian politician and cosmonaut. He served as a flight engineer for the International Space Station (ISS) long duration Expedition 27/28 missions. Samokutyaev also served as the Soyuz TMA-21 commander. His last mission was Soyuz TMA-14M Expedition 41/42 aboard the ISS.

Samokutyaev represented the Lermontovsky constituency in the State Duma from 2020 until his death.

== Early life and education ==
Samokutyaev was born on 13 March 1970 in Penza. In 1987–1988, Samokutyaev studied at Penza Polytechnical Institute. He then moved to Chernigov where he graduated from the Chernigov Higher Military Pilot School with a degree in pilot engineering in 1992. In 2000, Samokutyaev graduated from the Gagarin Air Force Academy with a degree in military and administrative management.

== Air Force career ==
Samokutyaev flew as a pilot, as a senior pilot, and as a deputy commander of an air squadron in the Russian Air Force.

== Cosmonaut career ==
Samokutyaev joined the cosmonaut corps in 2003 and qualified as a test-cosmonaut in 2005. He trained as a member of the Expedition 23/24 backup crew.

In July 2008, Samokutyaev was assigned to the backup crew for Expedition 25 to the ISS. He joined the ISS advanced training as a backup commander and from 2009 as a flight engineer. During the launch of Soyuz TMA-18 on 2 April 2010, he served as a backup commander of the Soyuz spacecraft.

=== Expedition 27/28 ===
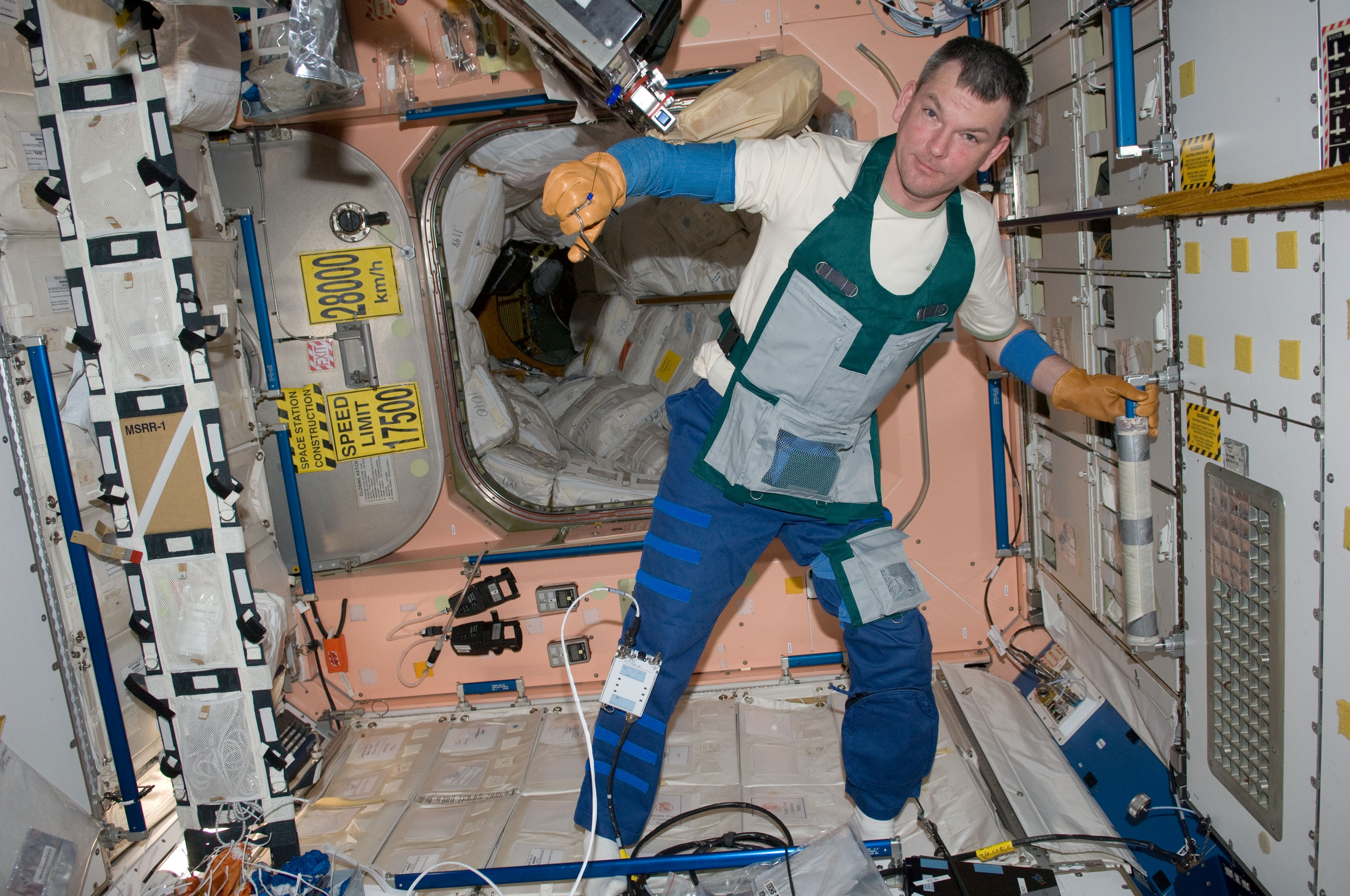
Alexander Samokutyaev inside the Unity node of the space station

In October 2008, Samokutyaev was assigned to the main crew of the 27th long-duration expedition to the JSS. On 7 October 2009, his assignment was confirmed by NASA (press release No. 09-233).

Samokutyaev flew into space for the first time as a flight engineer for the ISS long-duration expedition 27/28 missions. The Soyuz TMA-21 spacecraft carrying Samokutyaev, cosmonaut Andrei Borisenko, and NASA astronaut Ron Garan launched on schedule from the Baikonur Cosmodrome's Gagarin's Start launch pad at 23:18 UTC on 4 April 2011. On this mission, Samokutyaev served as a commander. The launch of Soyuz TMA-21 was dedicated as a celebration of the 50th anniversary of the first space mission by Yuri Gagarin. During the mission, Samokutyaev carried with him a small stuffed dog given to him by his daughter. During a NASA TV broadcast, the toy was seen floating, indicating the weightlessness of space.

At 23:09 UTC on 6 April, after two days of solo flight, the Soyuz TMA-21 spacecraft docked at the ISS. Samokutyaev performed his first spacewalk on 3 August 2011 with Sergey Volkov, where he relocated equipment, installed a materials science experiment, and hand-deployed a micro-satellite outside the ISS.

Samokutyaev spent 164 days on board of ISS and Soyuz TMA-21 undocked from the Russian segment's Poisk module at 00:38 UTC on 16 September. Later that day, at 3:59 UTC, Soyuz TMA-21 capsule, carrying Samokutyaev, Borisenko, and Garan, touched down 93 miles southeast of the city of Zhezkazgan in Kazakhstan.

=== Expedition 41/42 ===
Samokutyaev returned to space aboard Soyuz TMA-14M, as part of the Expedition 41/42 long-duration ISS crew. The mission launched on 25 September 2014 and docked at the ISS on 26 September, mere six hours after lift-off. He performed his second space walk on 22 October 2014 with Maksim Surayev to jettison unneeded equipment and conduct a photographic survey of the station exterior.

He remained aboard the ISS until 11 March 2015 when Soyuz TMA-14M returned to Earth as scheduled.

=== Spacewalks ===
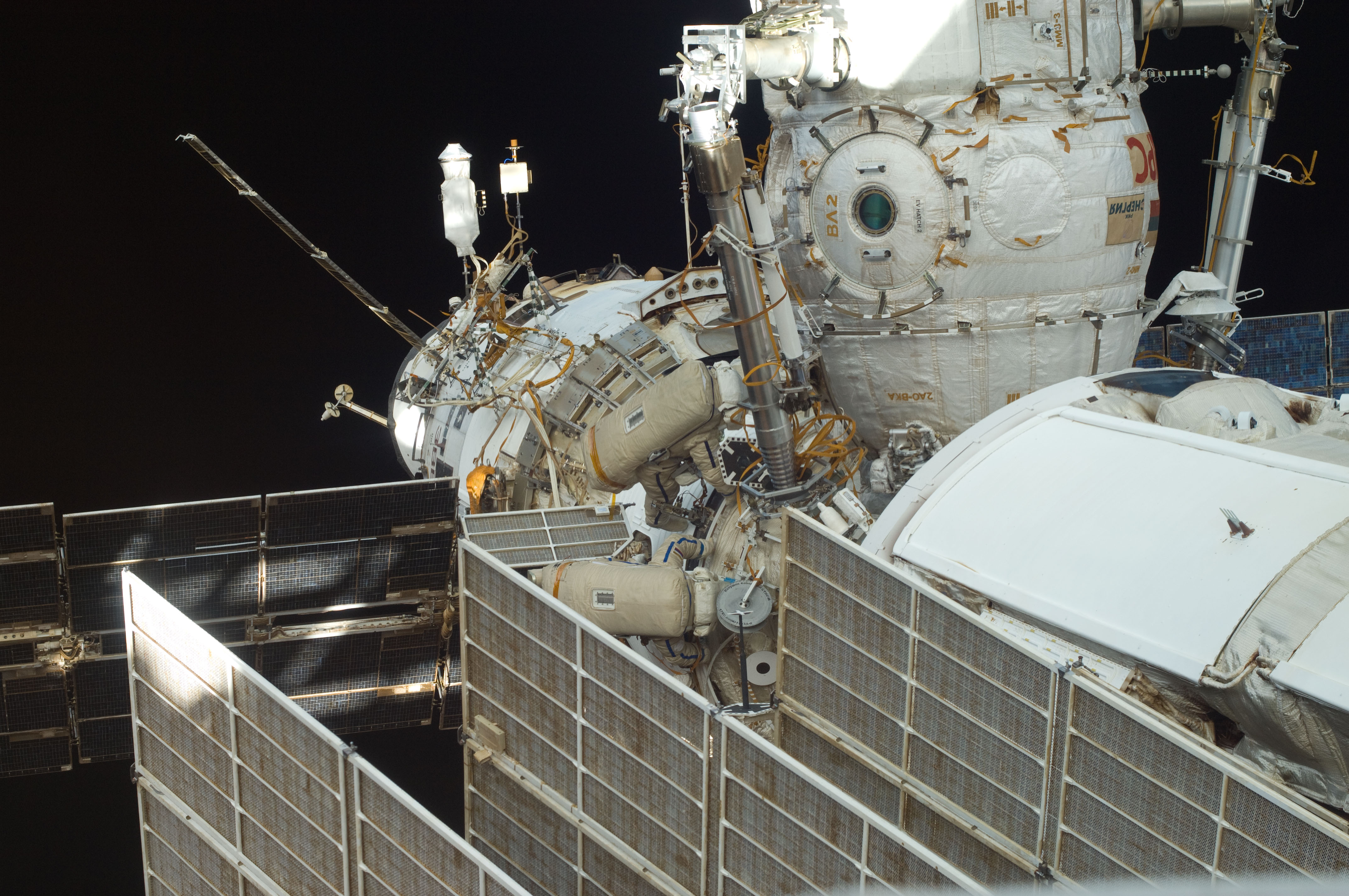
Samokutyaev and Volkov work outside the ISS during Russian EVA No. 28 on 3 August 2011

==== Russian EVA #28 ====
On 3 August 2011, Samokutyaev completed his first spacewalk, which lasted 6 hours and 23 minutes. Together with cosmonaut Sergey Volkov, he performed science tests, as well as routine maintenance tasks on the Russian segment of the ISS. Outside the Zvezda Service Module, Samokutyaev and Volkov installed new laser communications equipment. They also photographed an antenna showing signs of diminished functionality. Once the antenna problems were resolved by the ground control, the two cosmonauts deployed a small satellite named Radioskaf-V which had originally been planned for deployment at the beginning of the spacewalk. The satellite contained an amateur radio transmitter and a student experiment. The primary task of the spacewalk was relocating the Strela 1 boom from the Pirs module to the Poisk module, but it had to be called off due to time constraints. They did, however, successfully install a science experiment – BIORISK on a handrail outside the Pirs module. The BIORISK experiment studied the effects of microbes on spacecraft structures and of solar activity on microbial growth. Finally, Samokutyaev and Volkov took some photos holding old photographs of the first cosmonaut Yuri Gagarin, spacecraft designer Sergei Korolyov, and Soviet astronautic theory pioneer Konstantin Tsiolkovsky, with Earth in the background, before entering the Pirs module, thereby completing the Russian EVA-28.

==== Russian EVA #40 ====
Samokutyaev and cosmonaut Maksim Surayev performed a spacewalk outside the space station on 22 October 2014. Although planned as a six-hour spacewalk, the cosmonauts were able to complete all scheduled tasks in just 3 hours and 38 minutes. During the extravehicular activity, Samokutyaev and Surayev dismantled the RK 21-8 radiometria science payload and the 2ASF1-1 and 2ASF1-2 KURS antennas from the Poisk module. The RK-21-8 science payload had been installed during the Russian EVA-28 in early 2011, and consisted of an antenna system with a calibrator, a microwave radiometer receiver system, and a command information unit. It was used for a series of seismic forecasts and earthquake studies. The RK-21-8 payload was jettisoned by Surayev 33 minutes into the EVA, on a safe departure trajectory from the ISS. Samokutyaev jettisoned the antennas – the first one at 15:43 UTC, followed by the second one five minutes later. The cosmonauts also released a protective cover from the EXPOSE-R payload which had been developed by the European Space Agency to conduct astrobiology studies by exposing samples and experiments to the space environment. After completing all operations at the Poisk module, the cosmonauts photographed the orbital station's surface so specialists could later assess its condition. Russian EVA-40 was the 184th spacewalk in support of the ISS assembly.

Samokutyaev was dismissed from his role as an instructor and deputy commander of the cosmonaut corps due to medical concerns in 2017.

== Political career ==
Samokutyaev graduated from the Russian Presidential Academy of National Economy and Public Administration in 2019.

Samokutyaev represented the Lermontovsky constituency in the 7th and 8th State Duma, where he was a member of the Defense Committee.

In 2022, Samokutyaev was sanctioned by the United Kingdom government in relation to the Russo-Ukrainian War.

== Personal life and death ==
Samokutyaev was married to Oksana Nikolaevna; they had one daughter.

Samokutyaev died on 17 June 2026 at the age of 56.

== See also ==
- List of Heroes of the Russian Federation
