= Expedition 27 =

Long-duration mission to the International Space Station

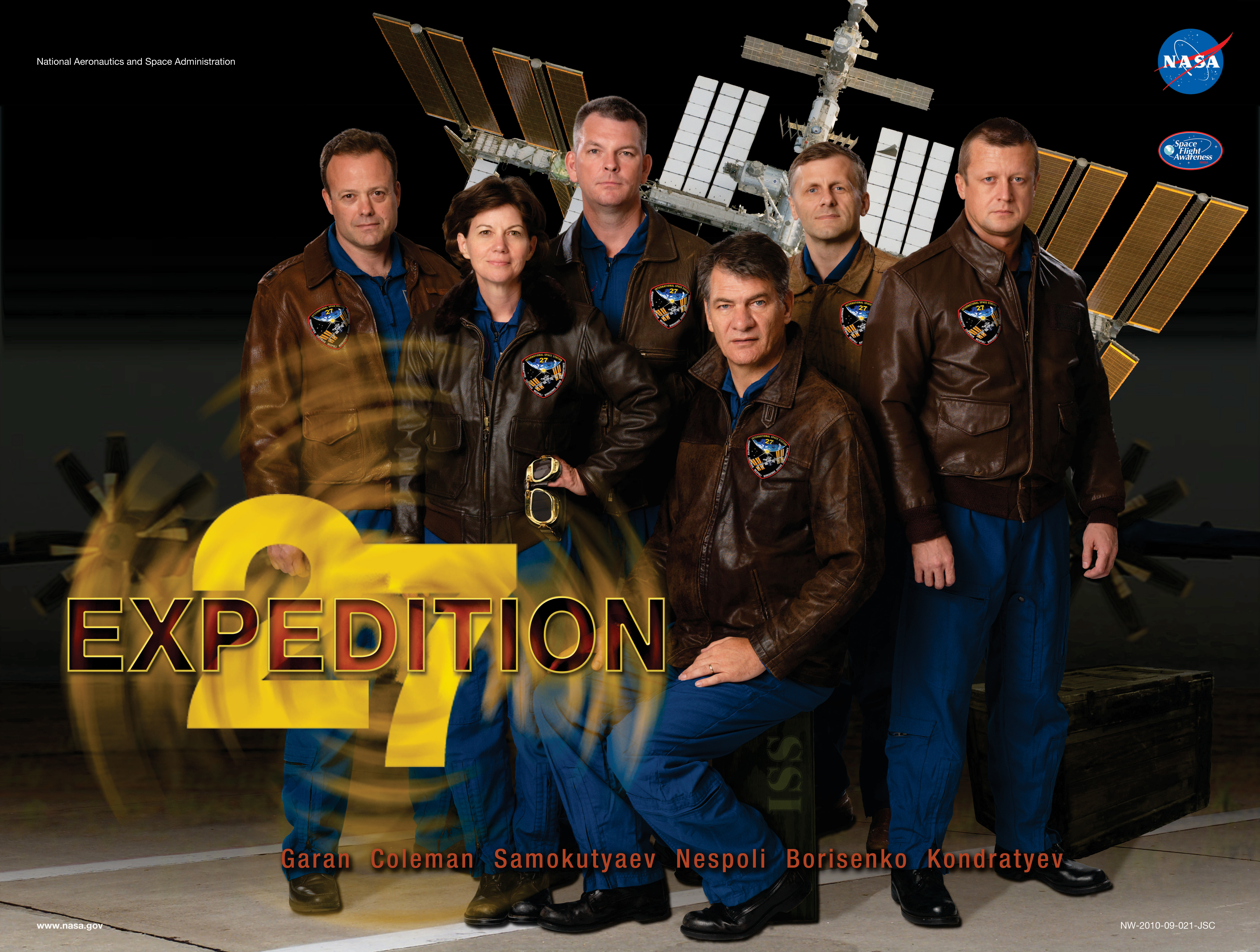
- Promotional Poster
- Mission type: Long-duration expedition

Expedition
- Space station: International Space Station
- Began: 16 March 2011, 04:27 UTC
- Ended: 23 May 2011, 21:35 UTC
- Arrived aboard: Soyuz TMA-20; Soyuz TMA-21
- Departed aboard: Soyuz TMA-20; Soyuz TMA-21

Crew
- Crew size: 6
- Members: Expedition 26/27: Dmitri Kondratyev; Catherine Coleman; Paolo Nespoli Expedition 27/28: Andrey Borisenko; Aleksandr Samokutyayev; Ron Garan
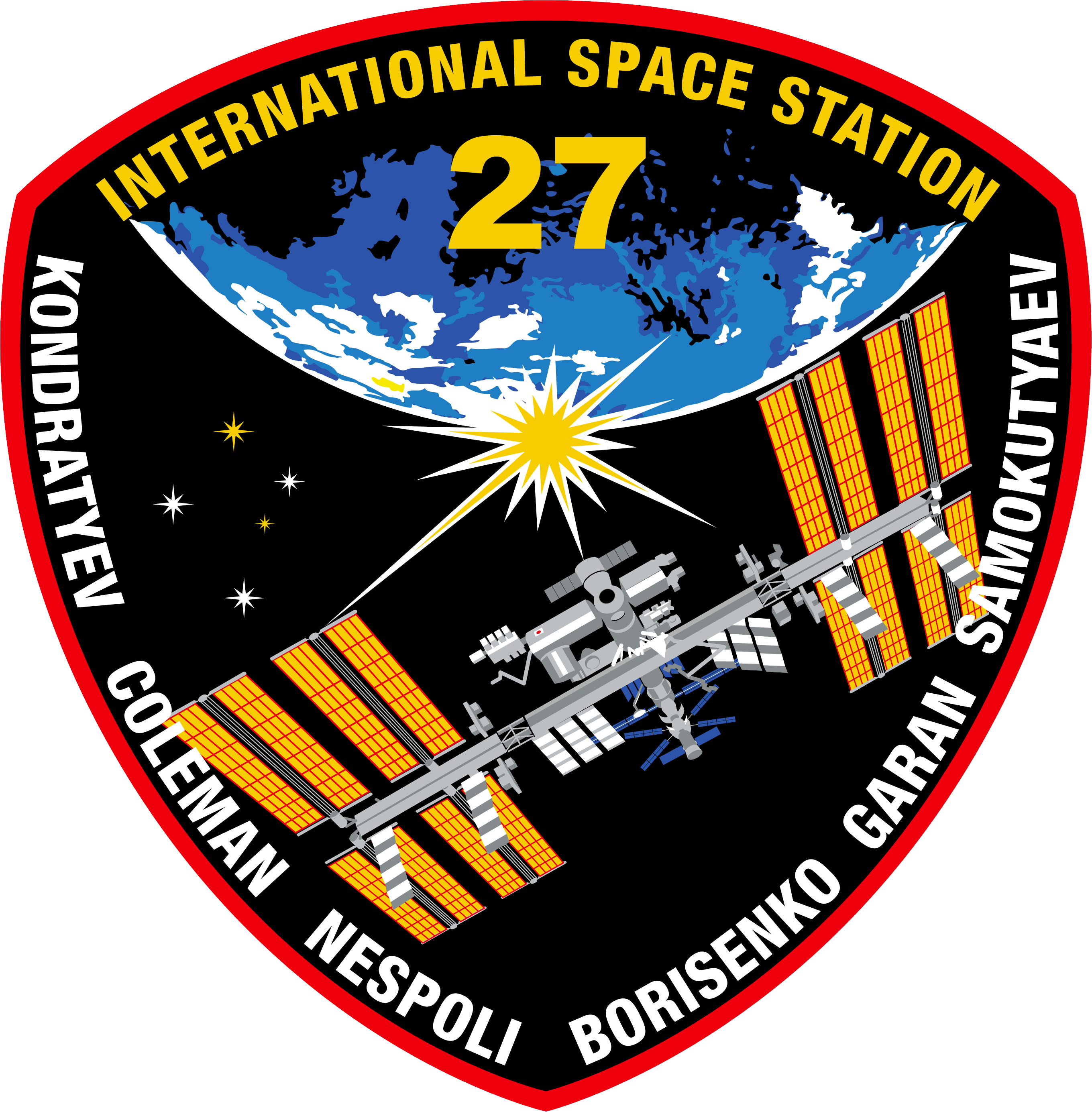
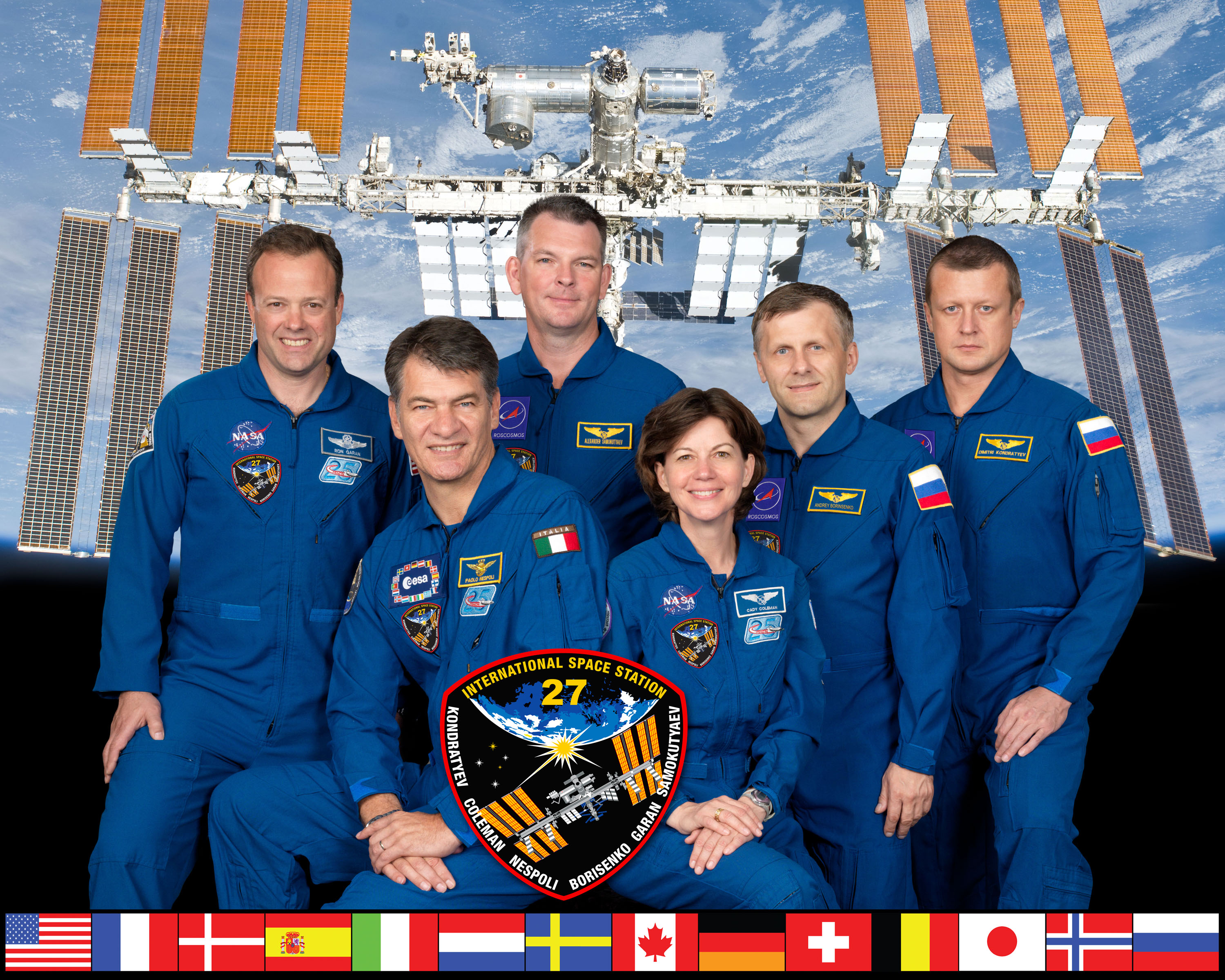
- Expedition 27 mission patch (l-r) Garan, Nespoli, Samokutyayev, Coleman, Borisenko and Kondratyev ISS expeditions

Expedition 27 was the 27th long-duration expedition to the International Space Station (ISS), starting on 16 March 2011. Expedition 27 saw numerous notable events, including the undocking of the Progress M-09M and Kounotori 2 spacecraft, the arrival of the Soyuz TMA-21 and Progress M-10M spacecraft, and the final rendezvous with the ISS of NASA's Space Shuttle Endeavour, on its last mission, STS-134. The expedition ended on 23 May 2011 with the departure of the Soyuz TMA-20 spacecraft, although command of the station was ceremonially handed over to the crew of Expedition 28 on 22 May.

== Crew ==
Position	First part (March 2011)	Second part (April 2011 to May 2011)
Commander	Dmitri Kondratyev, RSA; Only spaceflight	
Flight Engineer 1	Catherine Coleman, NASA; Third and last spaceflight	
Flight Engineer 2	Paolo Nespoli, ESA; Second spaceflight	
Flight Engineer 3		Andrey Borisenko, RSA; First spaceflight
Flight Engineer 4		Aleksandr Samokutyayev, RSA; First spaceflight
Flight Engineer 5		Ron Garan, NASA; Second and last spaceflight

Source
NASA

== Mission highlights ==
=== Kounotori 2 undocking ===
After an extended two-month stay, Kounotori 2 was detached from the nadir docking port of the Harmony module by the Canadarm 2 robotic arm at 15:29 UTC on 28 March 2011, and released at 15:46 UTC. Launched in January 2011 to resupply the ISS, Kounotori 2 (also known as HTV-2) was the second Japanese H-II Transfer Vehicle. It reentered Earth's atmosphere at around 03:09 UTC on 30 March.

=== Soyuz TMA-21 docking ===
The Soyuz TMA-21 spacecraft launched from Baikonur Cosmodrome on 4 April 2011, carrying Expedition 27 crew members Aleksandr Samokutyayev, Andrei Borisenko and Ronald Garan. It docked with the space station on 6 April at 23:09 UTC. The docking to the Poisk module occurred as the two spacecraft were orbiting over the Andes Mountains in Chile. The hatches between Soyuz TMA-21 and the ISS were opened at 2:13 UTC on 7 April. The three Soyuz crew members were welcomed aboard for a crew greeting ceremony and a mandatory safety orientation by Expedition 27 Commander Dmitri Kondratyev and Flight Engineers Catherine Coleman and Paolo Nespoli.

=== 50th anniversary of first spaceflight ===
On 12 April 2011, the Expedition 27 crew recorded a special video message aboard the ISS in celebration of the 50th anniversary of the first crewed spaceflight, which was conducted by Soviet cosmonaut Yuri Gagarin in 1961. The crew recorded their greeting in Russian, English, and Italian while wearing black Gagarin T-shirts.

=== Progress M-09M undocking ===
The Progress M-09M cargo spacecraft was undocked from the station's Pirs module at 11:41 UTC on 22 April 2011. After departing the space station, the spacecraft was used for the Radar-Progress scientific experiment to investigate a reflection feature of the plasma generated by operations of the Progress propulsion system. Upon the completion of this experiment, the spacecraft was deorbited, and reentered over the "spacecraft cemetery" in the South Pacific Ocean.

Progress M-09M had been launched on a resupply mission to the ISS on 28 January 2011. It carried 2,666 kilograms (5,878 pounds) of cargo to the space station, consisting of 1,444 kilograms (3,183 pounds) of dry cargo, 752 kilograms (1,658 pounds) of propellant, 50 kilograms (110 pounds) of oxygen and 420 kilograms (930 pounds) of water.

=== Progress M-10M docking ===
Flying two days autonomously after liftoff from the Baikonour Cosmodrome, the Progress M-10M cargo spacecraft arrived at the ISS on 29 April 2011, successfully docking at 14:19 UTC to the nadir port of the Pirs module, which had been vacated by Progress M-09M. The docking occurred as the two spacecraft were traveling 220 miles (350 kilometers) over western Mongolia. The linkup happened just over five hours before NASA's first launch attempt of the Space Shuttle Endeavour on the STS-134 mission. The shuttle launch was scrubbed because of the failure of two heaters on one of Endeavour's auxiliary power units. Endeavour finally launched successfully on 16 May 2011.

=== STS-134 ===
STS-134, the second-to-the-last mission of the Space Shuttle program, was launched from Kennedy Space Center on 16 May 2011 at 12:56 UTC. Space Shuttle Endeavour docked to the ISS on 18 May at 10:14 UTC, and delivered the Alpha Magnetic Spectrometer 2 (AMS-2) and an Express Logistics Carrier to the station, completing the assembly of the US Orbital Segment of the ISS. On 22 May, while Endeavour was docked, the members of Expedition 27 formally handed over command of the station to the members of Expedition 28. The following day, on 23 May, the Soyuz TMA-20 spacecraft departed from the ISS, returning Expedition 27 crew members Paolo Nespoli, Catherine Coleman and Dmitri Kondratyev to Earth. Soyuz TMA-20 landed safely in central Kazakhstan at 02:27 UTC on 24 May 2011, having taken photographs of the shuttle docked at the ISS prior to re-entry.

== Gallery ==
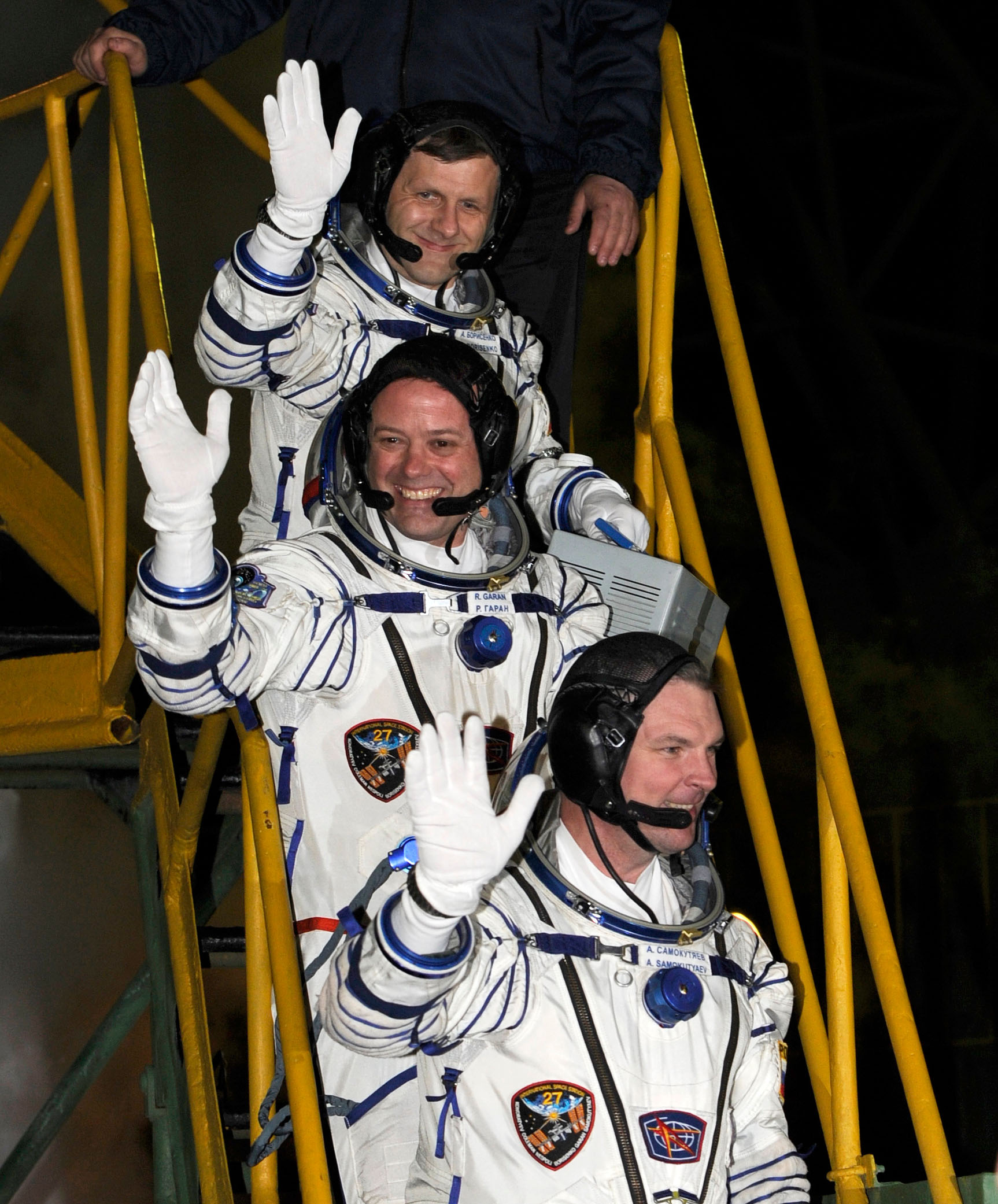
Borisenko, Garan, and Samokutyaev wave farewell from the bottom of the Soyuz rocket prior to their launch.

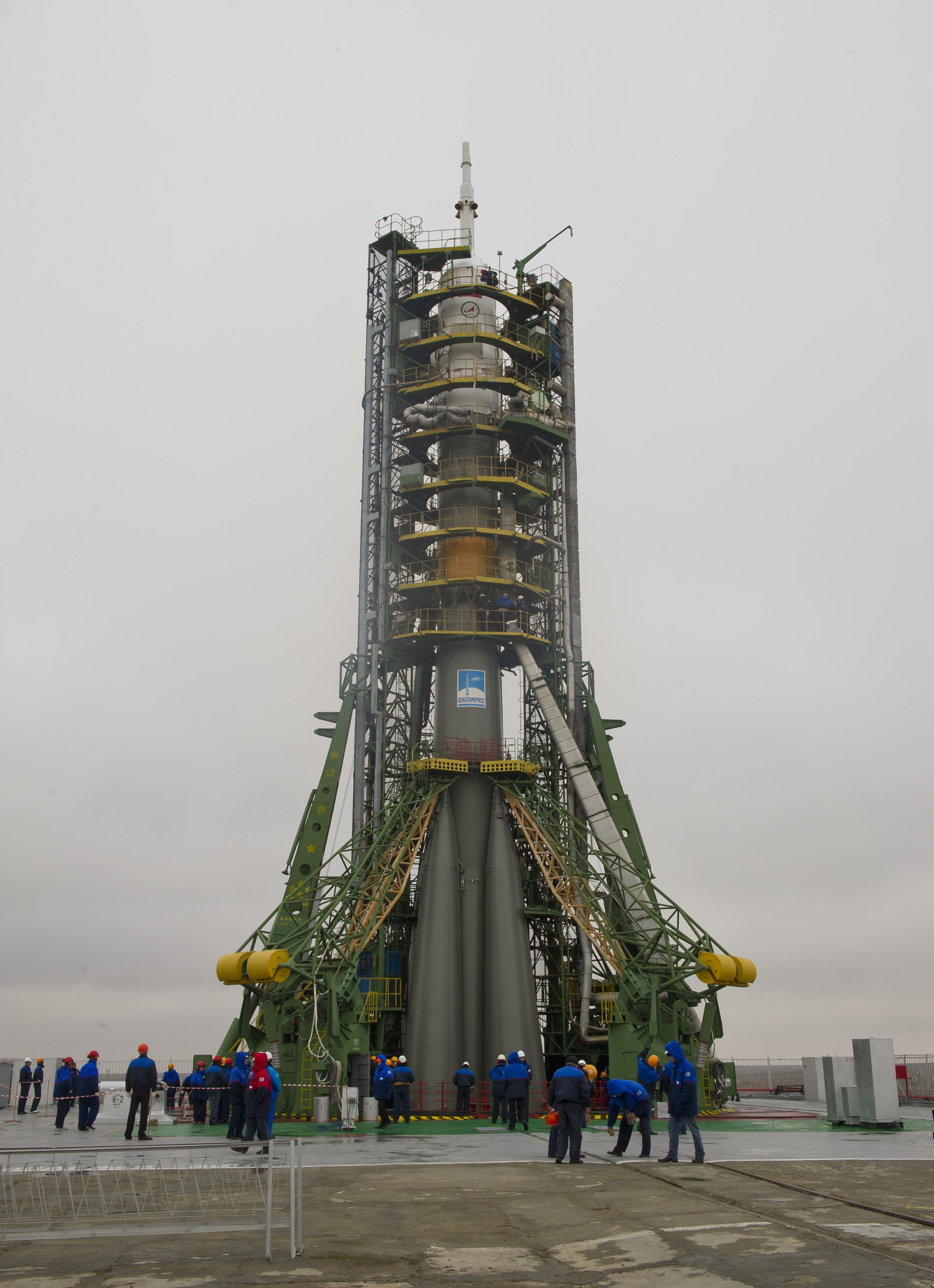
The Soyuz TMA-21 spacecraft on its launchpad.

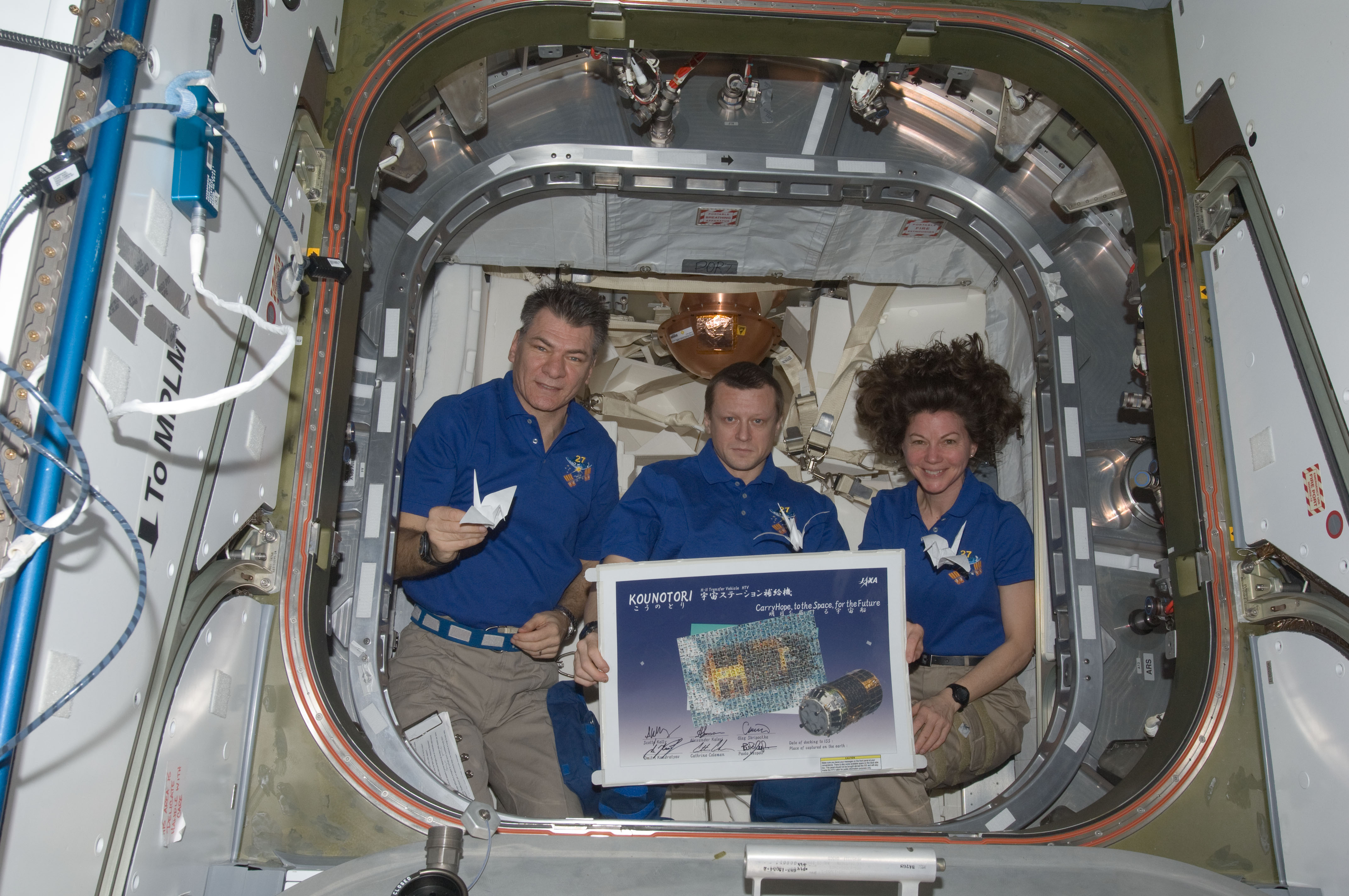
In honour of those affected by the 2011 Tōhoku earthquake and tsunami in Japan, Kondratyev (center), Nespoli & Coleman are pictured with origami cranes, which they folded to be placed in the HTV-2.

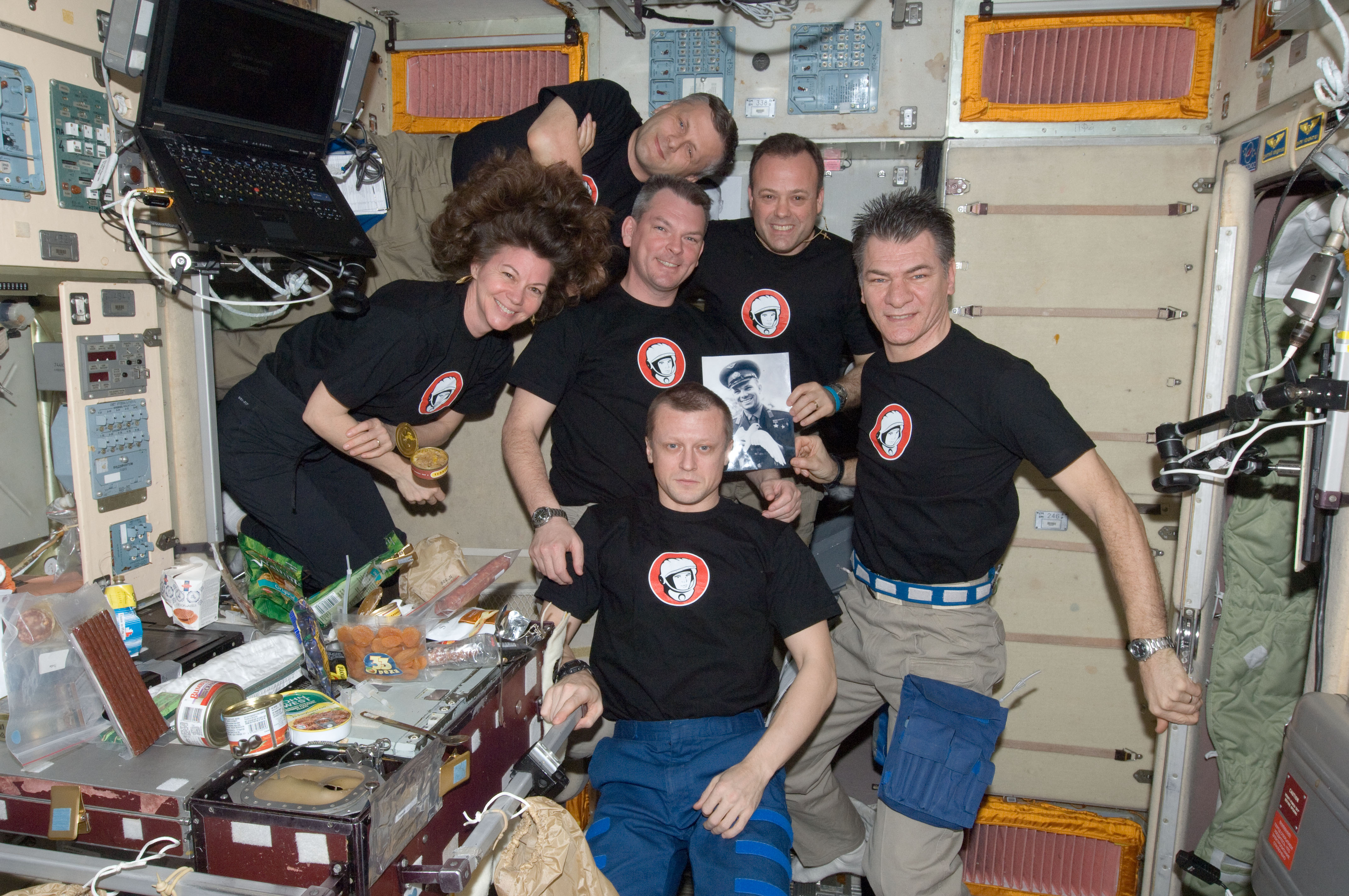
Expedition 27 crew members pose for a photo near the galley in the Zvezda Service Module of the ISS in honor of the 50th anniversary of the spaceflight of Yuri Gagarin, the first human launched in space, on 12 April 1961.

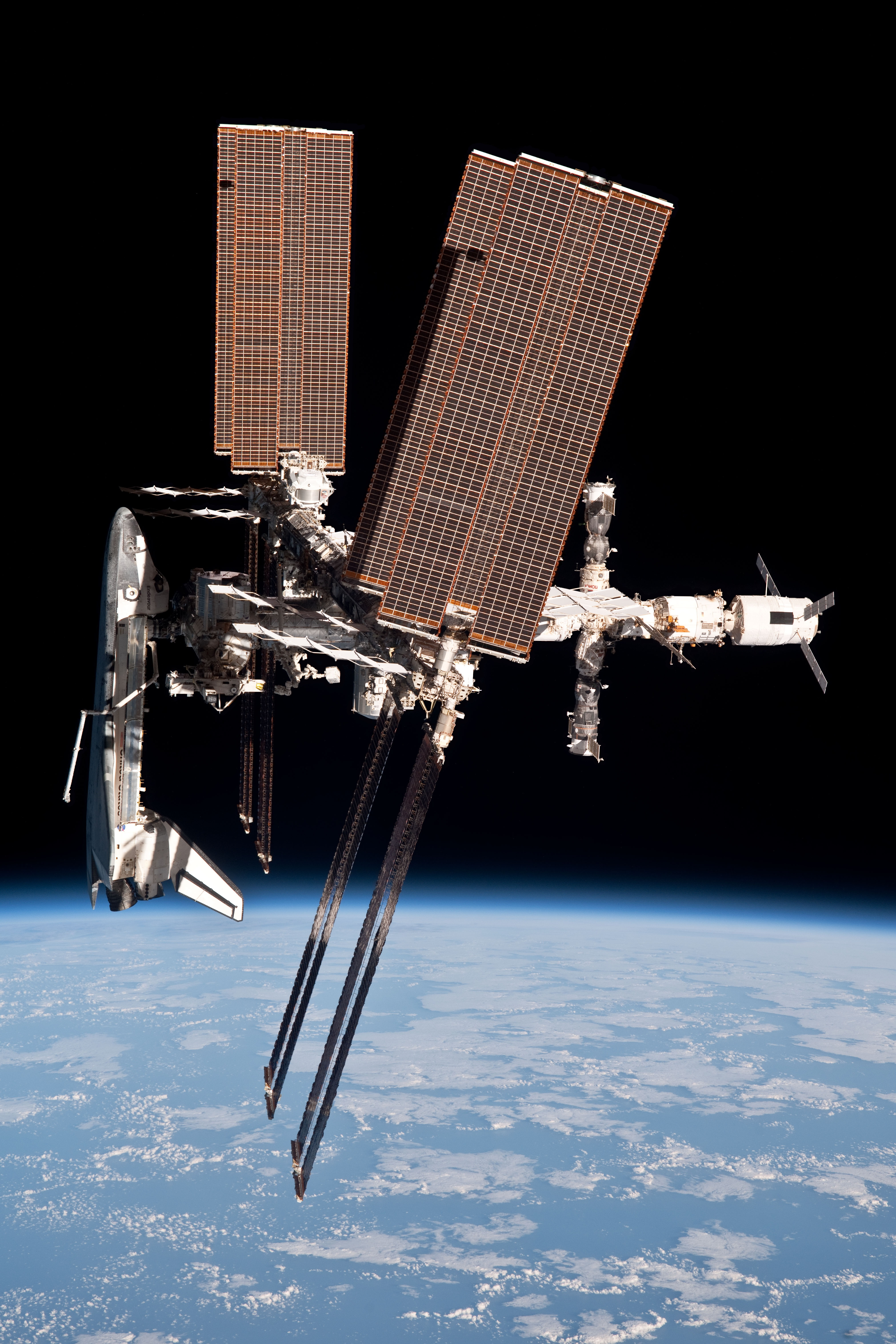
Photo of the ISS and Endeavour taken from Soyuz TMA-20.

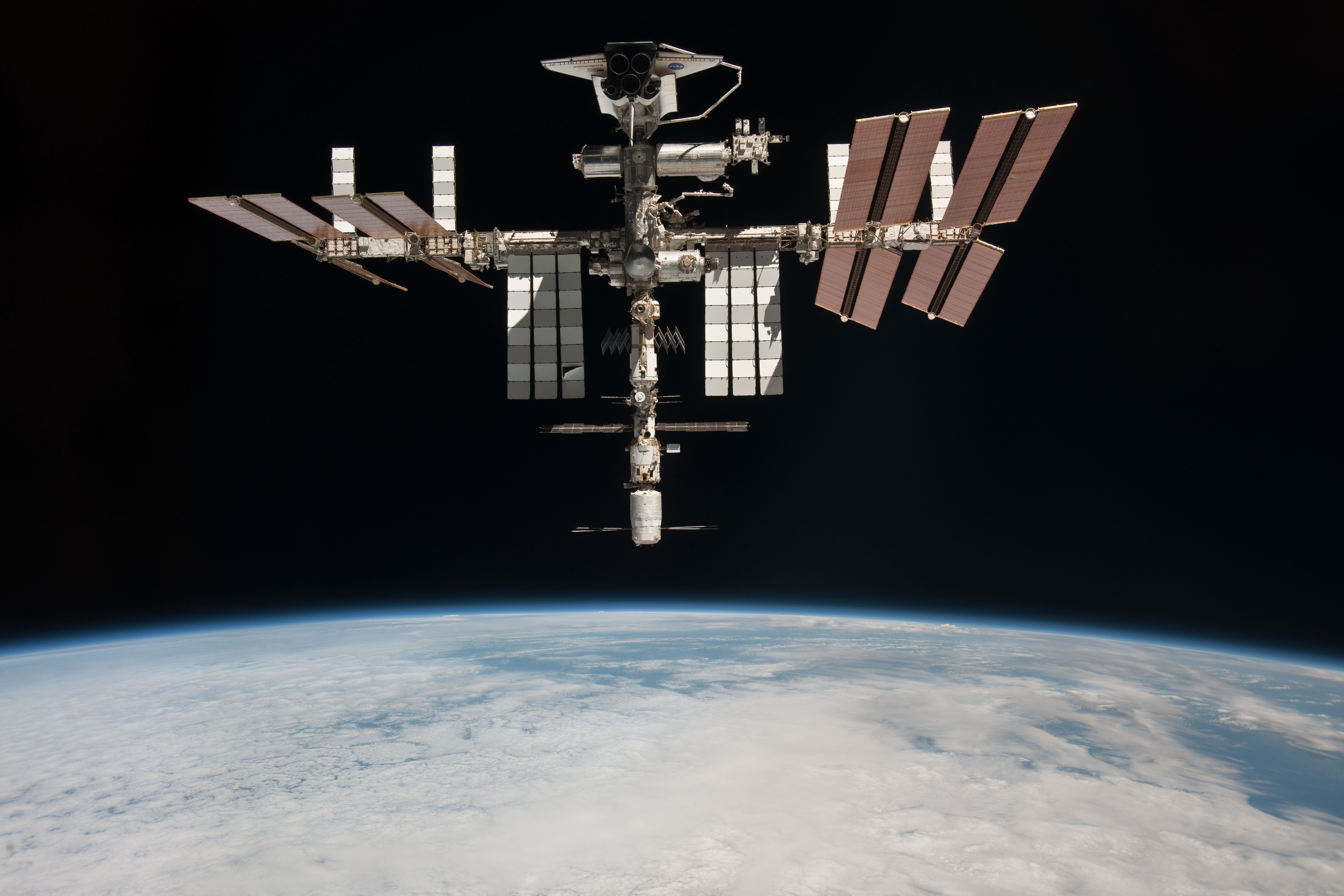
Photo of the ISS and Endeavour taken from Soyuz TMA-20.

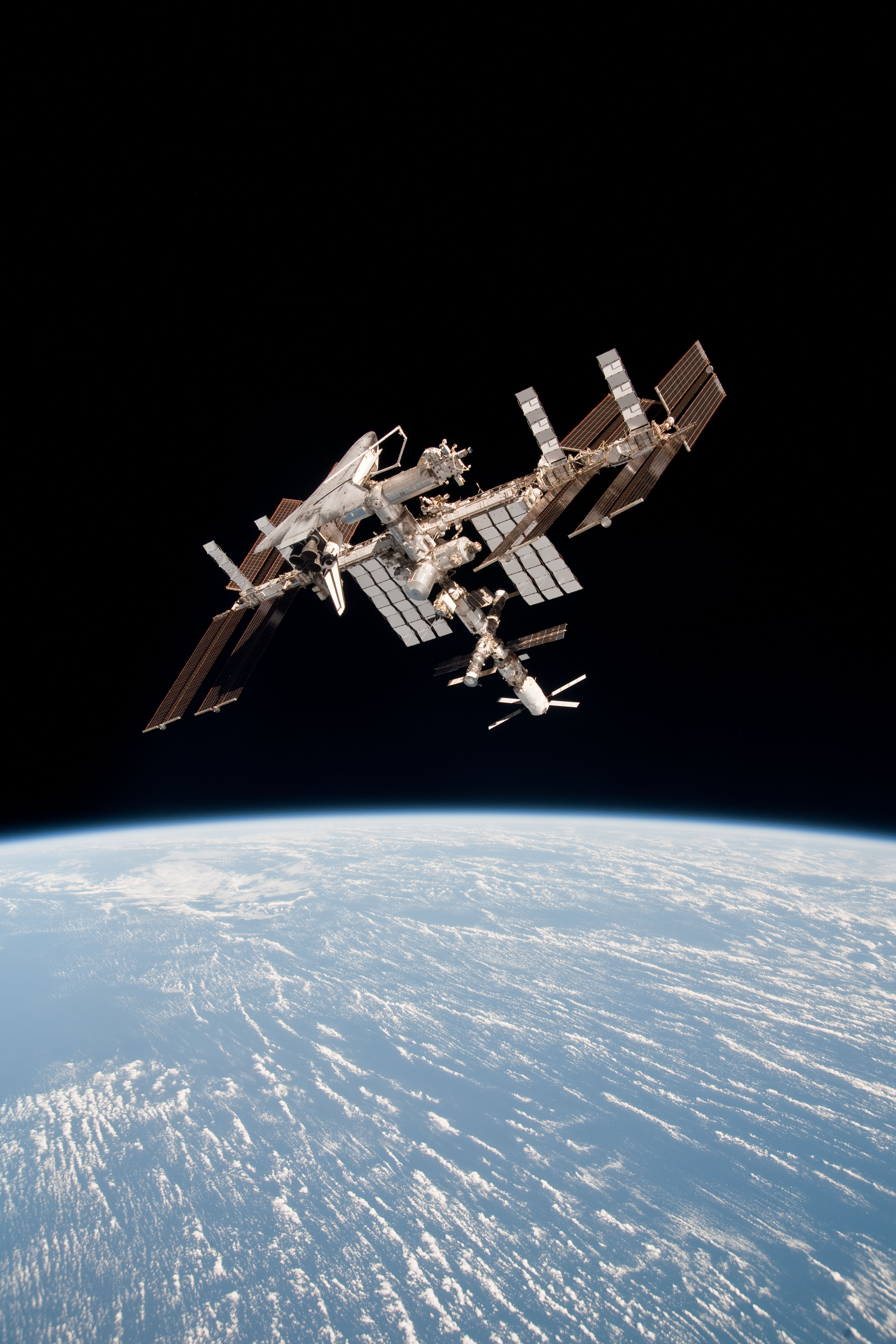
Photo of the ISS and Endeavour taken from Soyuz TMA-20.

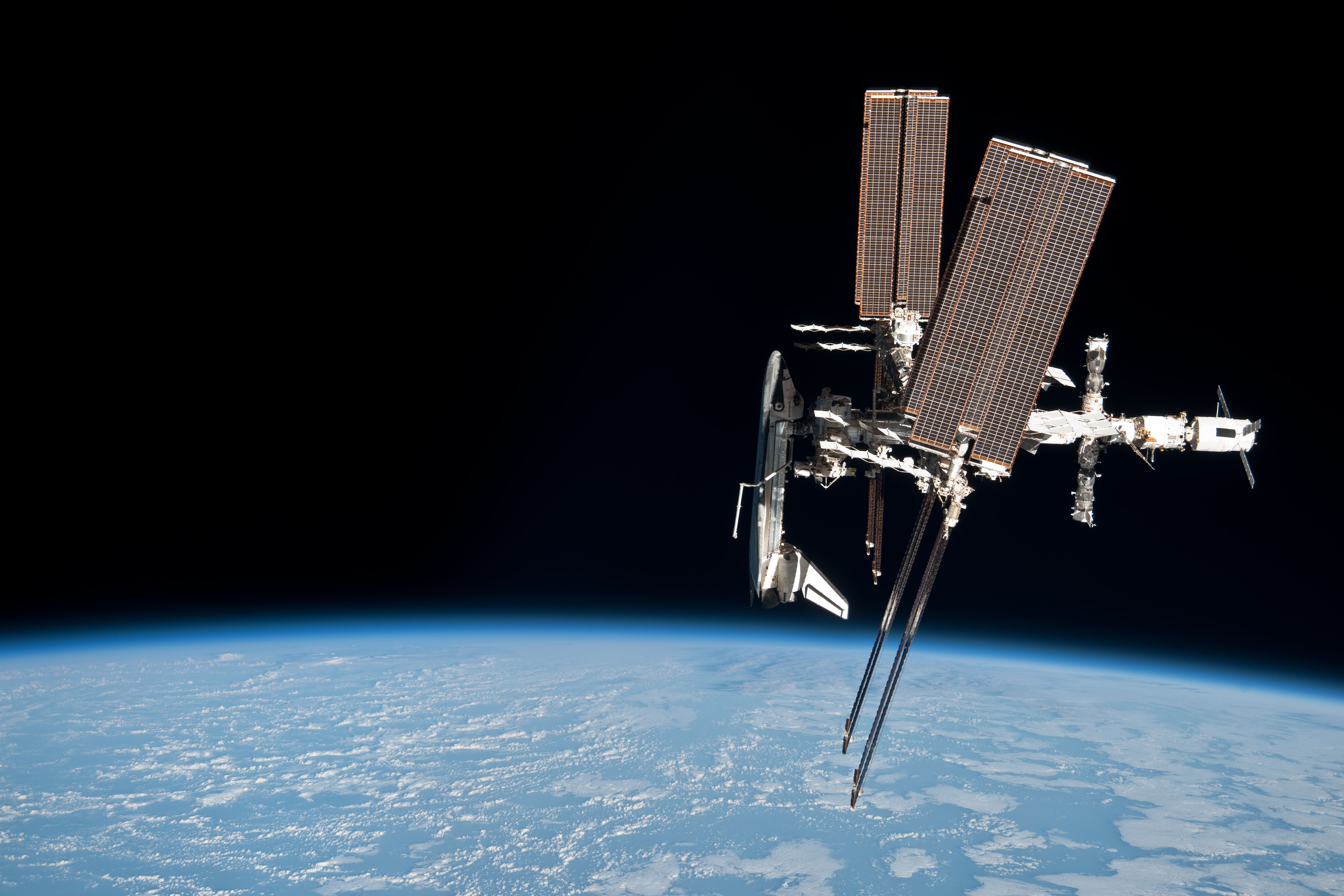
Photo of the ISS and Endeavour taken from Soyuz TMA-20.

A photo of the ISS and Endeavour as seen from Soyuz TMA-20, with all components tagged.

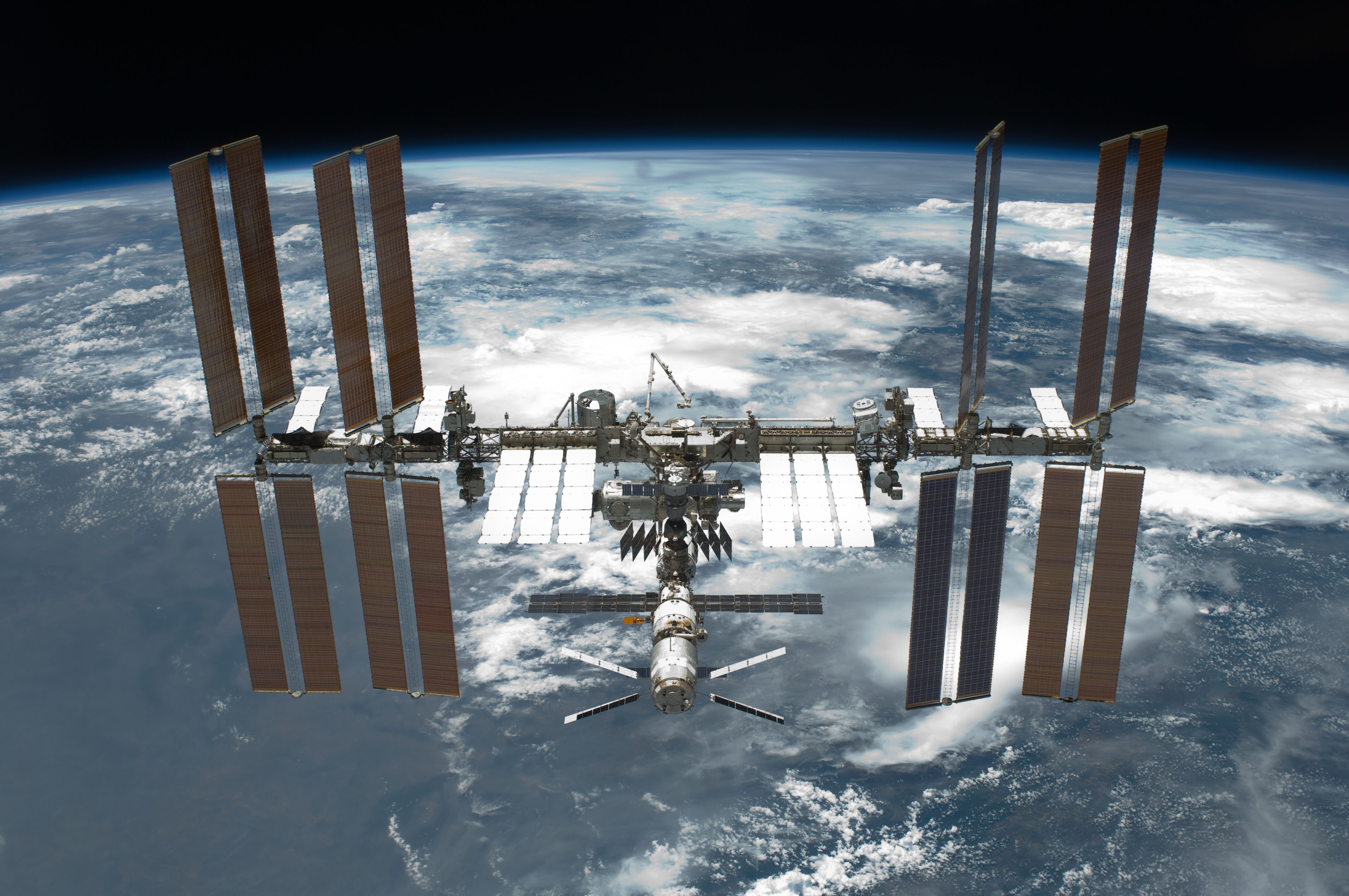
ISS, taken by a crew member on Endeavour after undocking.

Video of Soyuz TMA-20 landing.

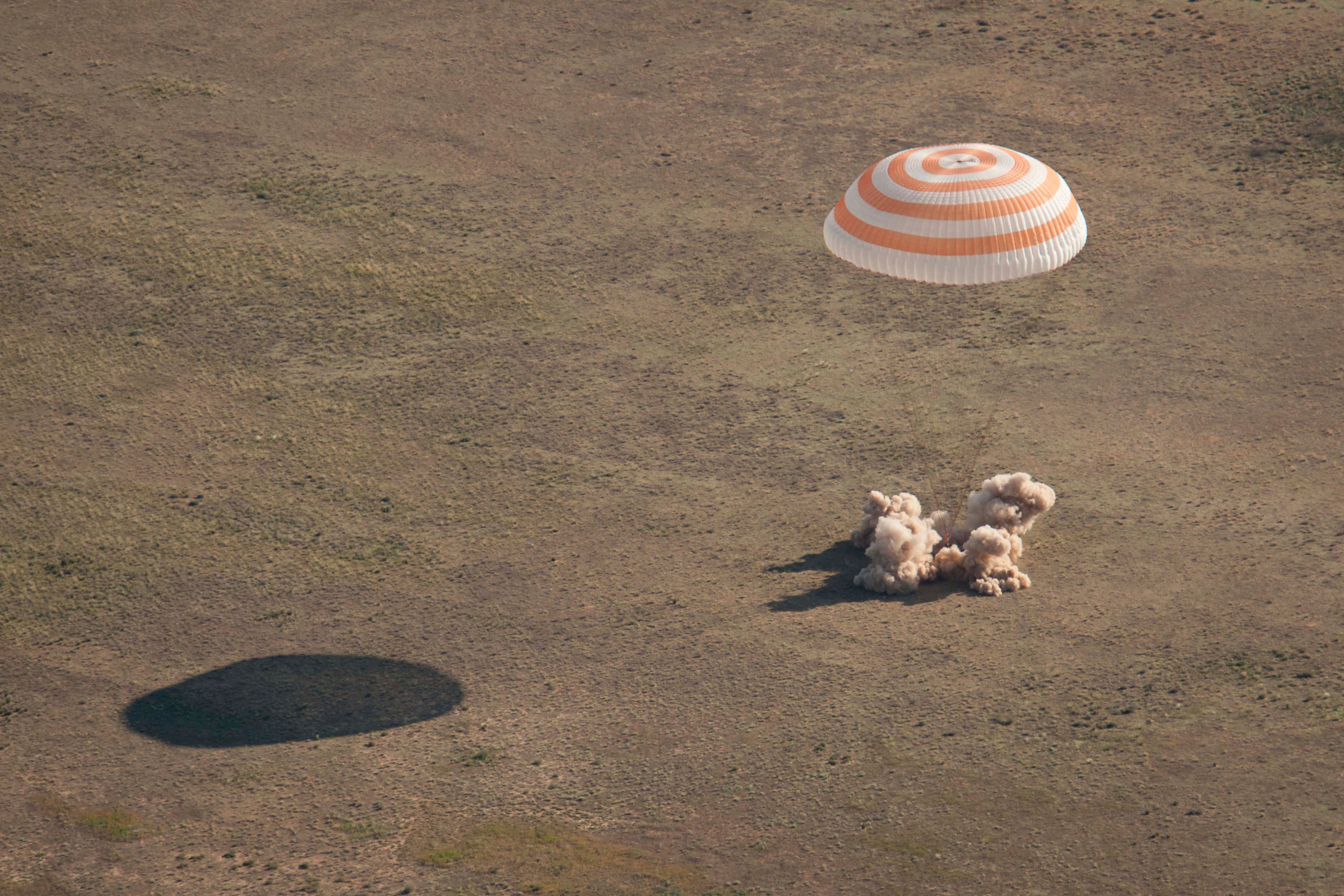
Soyuz TMA-20 lands.
