= Soyuz TMA-21 =

2011 Russian crewed spaceflight to the ISS

- Operator: Roscosmos
- COSPAR ID: 2011-012A
- SATCAT no.: 37382
- Mission duration: 164d, 17h, 42m

Spacecraft properties
- Spacecraft type: Soyuz-TMA 11F732
- Manufacturer: Energia

Crew
- Crew size: 3
- Members: Aleksandr Samokutyayev; Andrey Borisenko; Ronald J. Garan
- Callsign: Tarkhany

Start of mission
- Launch date: April 4, 2011, 22:18:20 UTC
- Rocket: Soyuz-FG
- Launch site: Baikonur 1/5

End of mission
- Landing date: September 16, 2011, 03:59:39 UTC

Orbital parameters
- Reference system: Geocentric
- Regime: Low Earth
- Perigee altitude: 201.2 kilometres (125.0 mi)
- Apogee altitude: 254.69 kilometres (158.26 mi)
- Inclination: 51.65 degrees
- Period: 88.76 minutes

Docking with ISS
- Docking port: Poisk zenith
- Docking date: 6 April 2011; 23:09 UTC
- Undocking date: 16 September 2011; 00:38 UTC
- Time docked: 162d 1h 29m
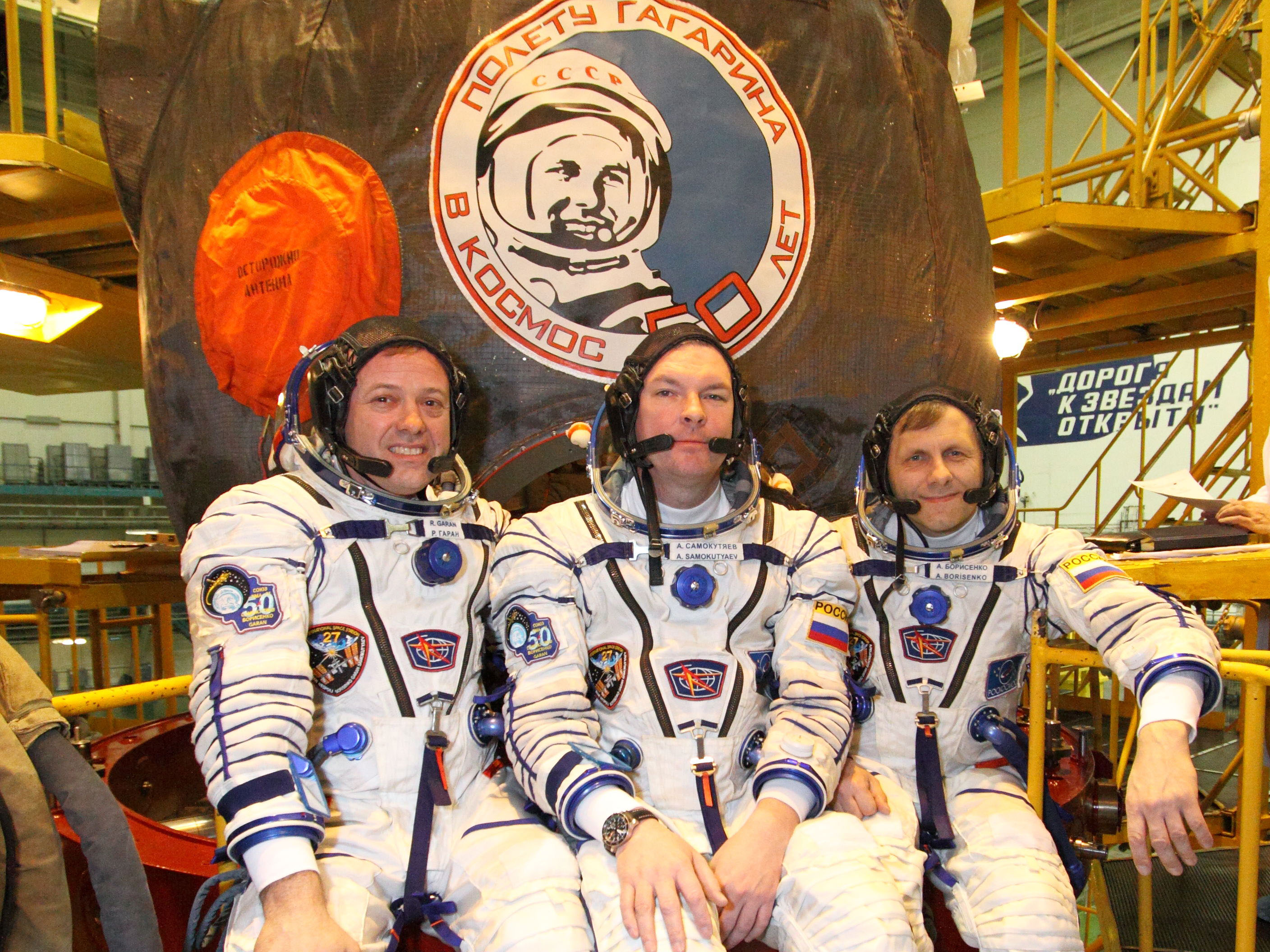
- From left to right: Garan, Samokutyayev and Borisenko in front their Soyuz TMA-21 spacecraft dubbed "Gagarin" Soyuz programme (Crewed missions)

Soyuz TMA-21 ("Gagarin") was a Soyuz flight to the International Space Station (ISS). It transported three members of the Expedition 27 crew to the ISS, and docked at the station on April 6, 2011. TMA-21 is the 109th flight of a Soyuz spacecraft, the first of which launched in 1967. The Soyuz remained attached to the space station as a lifeboat, throughout the remainder of Expedition 27 and through the end of Expedition 28, and returned to Earth on September 16, 2011.

The launch of Soyuz TMA-21 was devoted to the 50th anniversary of the first crewed space mission, which was conducted by Yuri Gagarin on April 12, 1961. The COSPAR International ID of Soyuz TMA-21 is 2011-012A.

== Crew ==
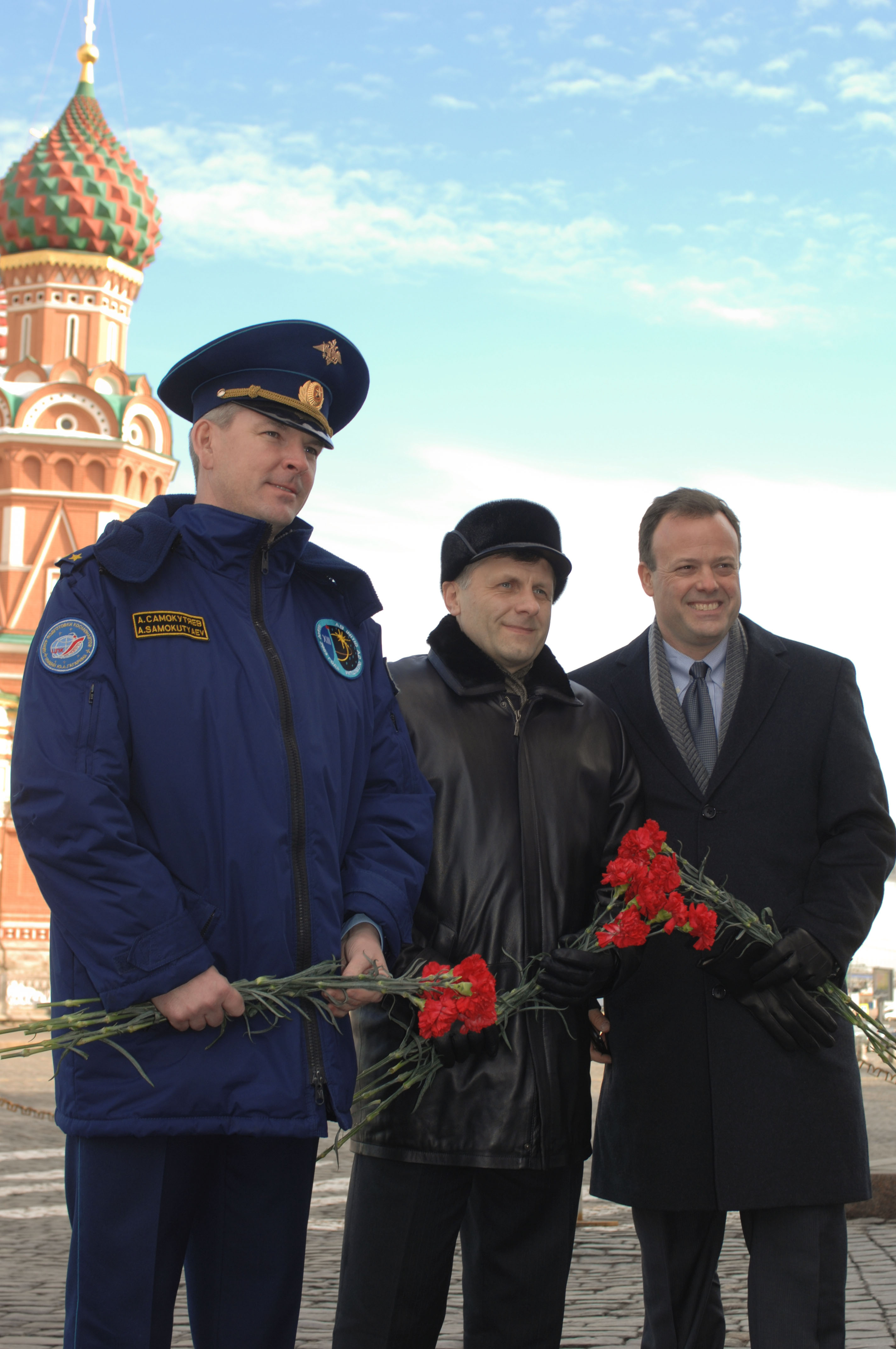
The Soyuz TMA-21 crew members conduct their ceremonial tour of Red Square on March 11, 2011.

Position	Crew Member
Commander	(Russia) Aleksandr Samokutyayev, Roscosmos; Expedition 27; First spaceflight
Flight Engineer 1	(Russia) Andrey Borisenko, Roscosmos; Expedition 27; First spaceflight
Flight Engineer 2	(United States) Ronald J. Garan, NASA; Expedition 27; Second and last spaceflight

=== Backup crew ===
Position	Crew Member
Commander	(Russia) Anton Shkaplerov, Roscosmos
Flight Engineer 1	(Russia) Anatoli Ivanishin, Roscosmos
Flight Engineer 2	(United States) Daniel C. Burbank, NASA

== Mission insignia ==
In December 2010, the Head of the Russian Federal Space Agency, Anatoly Perminov approved the patch of the Soyuz TMA-21 mission. The patch was designed based on a drawing by young artist Marciel Santos Kayle, a 12-year-old from French Guiana. According to a Roscosmos news release, Marciel's sketch was chosen for the crew patch, since it depicts Gagarin and his crew vehicle Vostok. The spacecraft will fly a drawing of Gagarin, and, apart from being called Gagarin, it will also be written on the spacecraft.

== Kvant-V equipment glitch ==
During the launch processing in March 2011, the Technical Management on Human Space System Flight Testing reported an operational glitch of the Kvant-V equipment. The Kvant-V system resides in the Instrumentation Propulsion Module – one of the three modules that make the Soyuz TMA-21 spacecraft. On March 13, Roscosmos Board held a meeting to discuss the issue and delayed the launch from March 30, 2011. The glitch was traced back to a faulty part (capacitor) in the equipment. Russian Space Agency Roscosmos established a working group with representatives from RSC-Energia and TSNIImash, the manufacturers and developers of the Soyuz systems. Proposals of the working group were considered during an additional General Designers’ Review led by RSC-Energia president Vitaly Lopota. After analyzing the submitted data by the Review, Roscosmos decided to set April 4 as the new launch date.

== Pre-launch processing ==
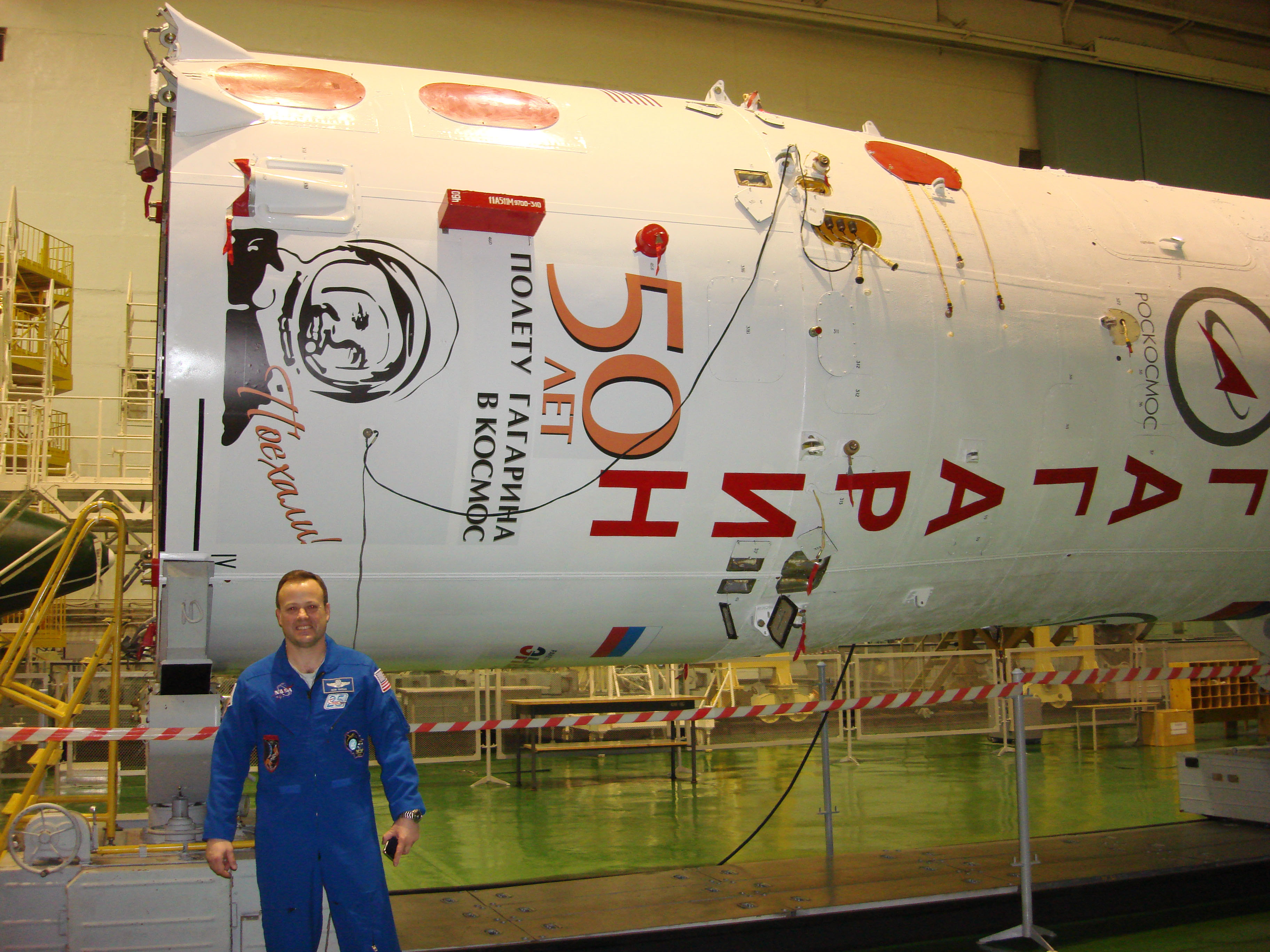
Garan stands in front of the Soyuz booster which bears the name and likeness of Yuri Gagarin.

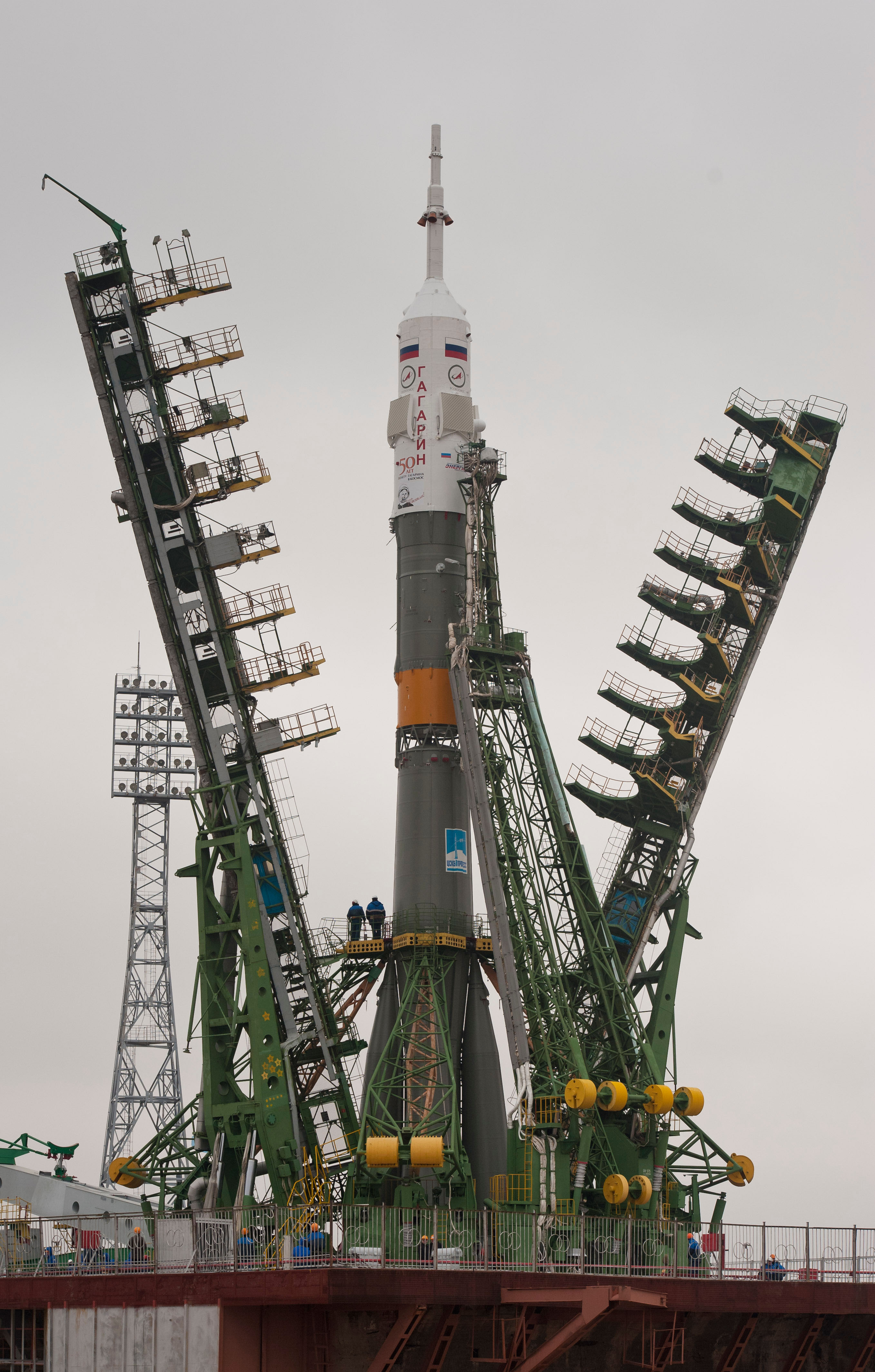
The Soyuz TMA-21 spacecraft on the launch pad.

The Soyuz TMA-21 spacecraft arrived at Baikonur Cosmodrome on February 9, 2011. On the same day, the RSC-Energia technicians, tested the spacecraft's Kurs system.

=== Crew training ===
Roscosmos' Gagarin Cosmonaut Training Center (GCTC) hosted a two-day exam session for the prime and backup crews of Soyuz TMA-21 on March 4–5. On March 4, the prime crew of Samokutyayev, Borisenko and Garan were tested through integrated training in the ISS simulator and their backup crew of Shkaplerov, Ivanishin and Burbank were tested in the Soyuz mockup. On the next day, the crews were swapped and examined. The two groups of crews passed the exams after solving all the tasks for which they were examined. Anatoly Perminov, the head of Roscosmos hosted the traditional tea-party with Soyuz TMA-21 prime and backup crews on March 11. On March 17, cosmonauts and astronauts left GCTC for Baikonur. On March 19, Roscosmos Board gave its final approval of the crews to go through training at the Baikonur Cosmodrome.

== Launch ==
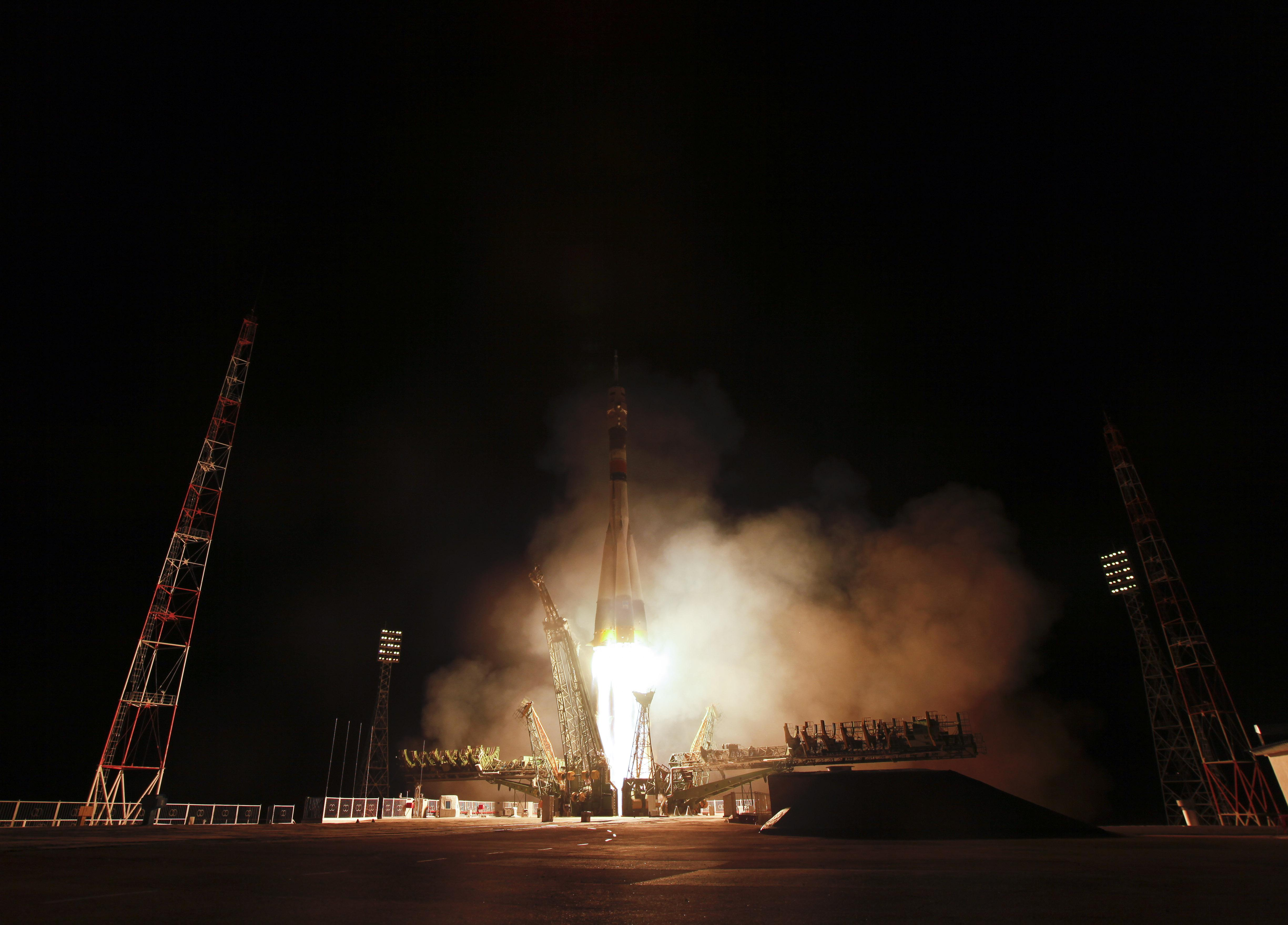
A Soyuz-FG rocket lifts the Soyuz TMA-21 spacecraft to orbit on April 4, 2011.

The Soyuz TMA-21 spacecraft launched on schedule from the Baikonur Cosmodrome's Gagarin's Start launch pad in Kazakhstan, at 23:18:20 UTC on April 4, 2011. Souyz Commander Samokutyaev was launched from the Soyuz's center seat with flight engineer Borisenko strapped in to his left and NASA astronaut Ronald Garan on his right.

The Soyuz-FG rocket followed a nominal ascent, and successfully inserted the spacecraft into orbit 8 minutes and 45 seconds after liftoff. In orbit, the spacecraft deployed its two solar panels and communications antennas as planned.

Samokutyayev, carried a small stuffed dog given to him by his daughter. Hanging in front of the crew, live NASA TV launch footage showed that the dog begun to float as the spacecraft soared skywards, an indication of the weightlessness of space. "Launch was great, and we are in orbit and we are doing great," said Samokutyaev after the launch. Replying back the Moscow Mission Control said "This is a great anniversary flight, and have a great one".

== Docking ==
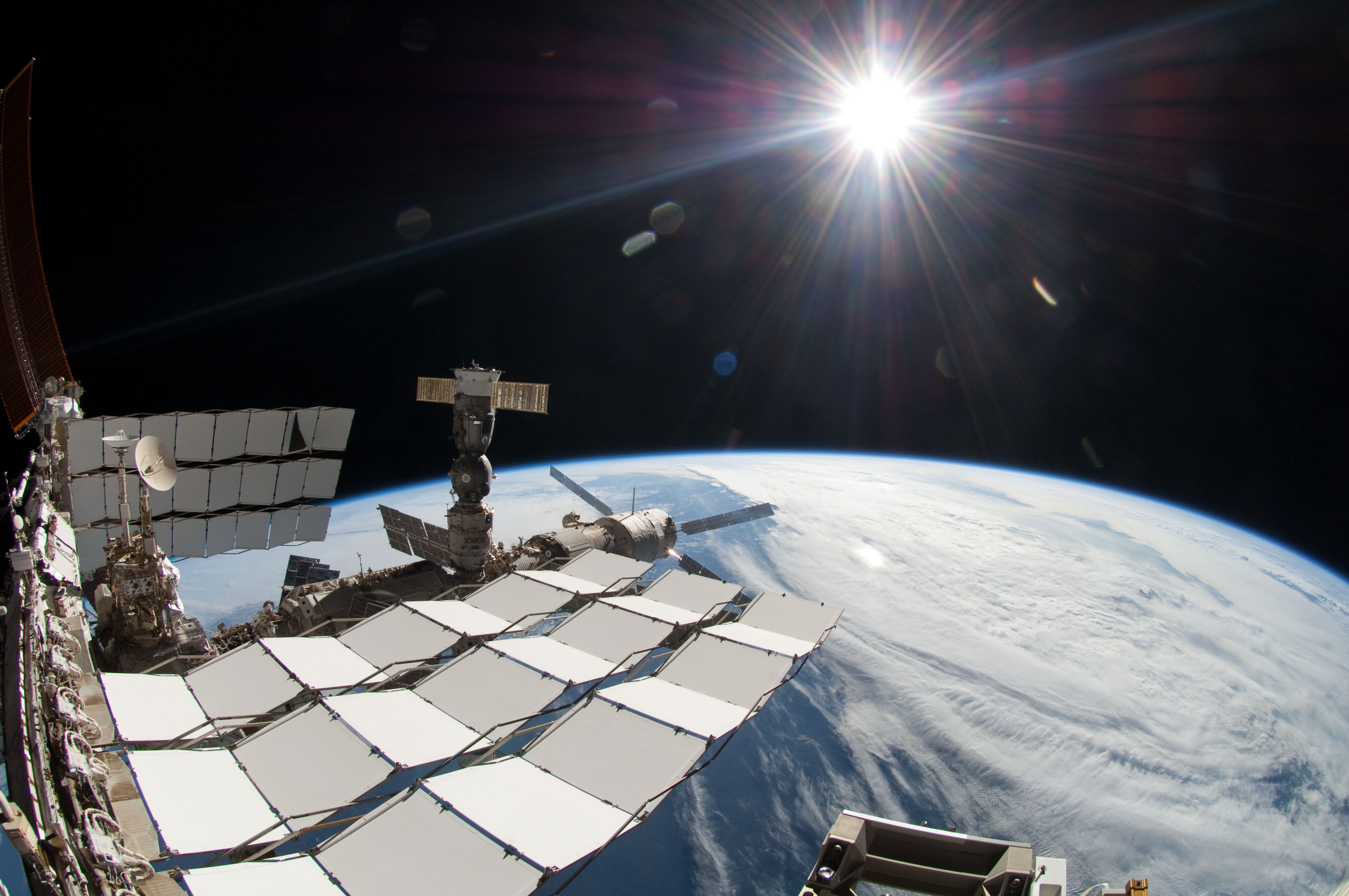
Soyuz spacecraft docked to the Poisk module is seen near to the center of the image.

The Soyuz TMA-21 spacecraft docked with the International Space Station (ISS) on April 6 at 23:09 UTC. The docking to the Poisk module occurred as the two spacecraft were orbiting over the Andes Mountains in Chile. Hatches between the Soyuz TMA-21 and the ISS were opened at 2:13 UTC on April 7. The three Soyuz crew members floated into the ISS. They were welcomed aboard for a crew greeting ceremony and a mandatory safety orientation by Expedition 27 Commander Dmitry Kondratyev and Flight Engineers Catherine Coleman and Paolo Nespoli.

== Return to Earth ==
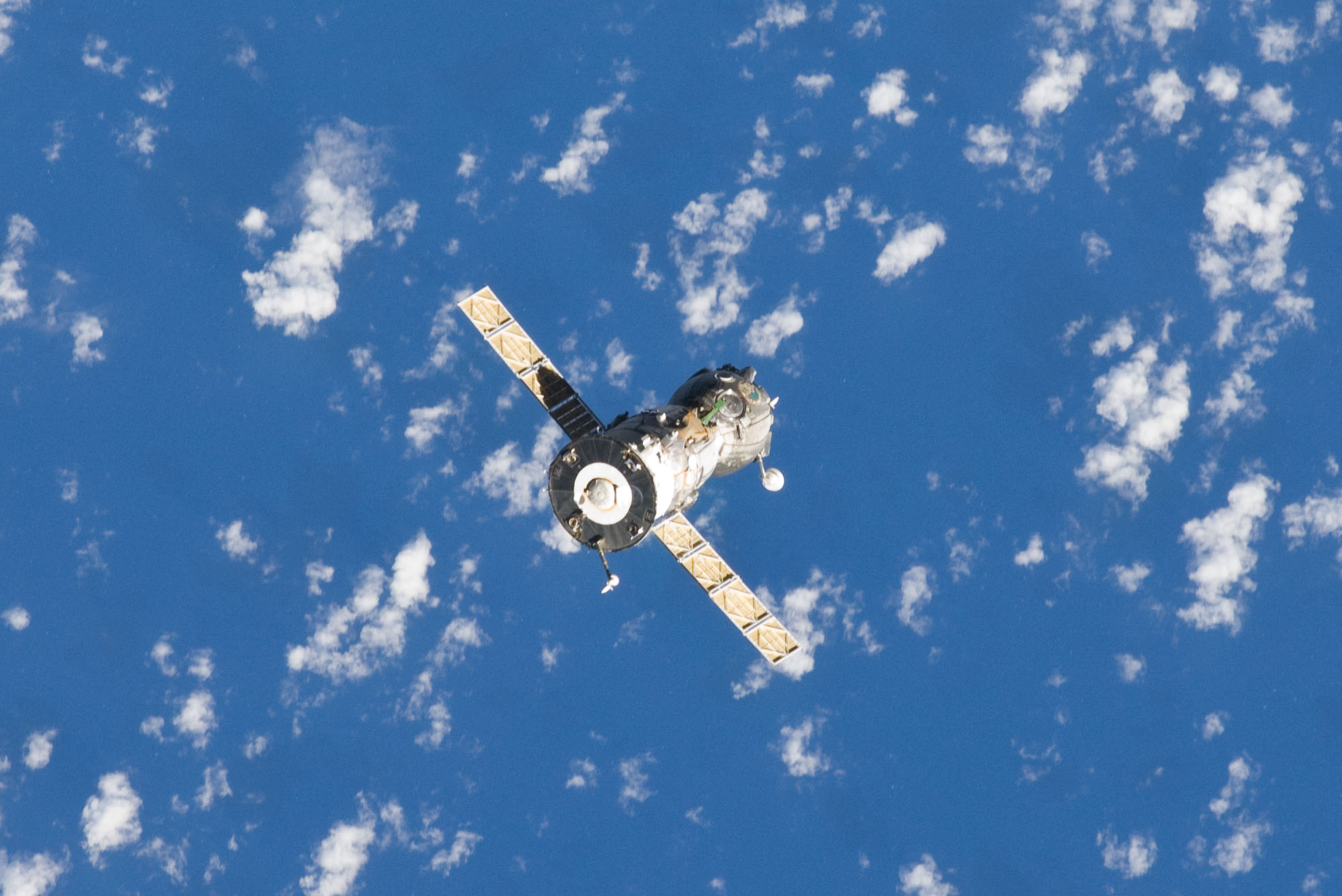
The Soyuz spacecraft departs the Space Station on September 16, 2011.

The Soyuz TMA-21 crew had been due to come back on September 8 but its return was delayed due to the crash of the Progress M-12M on August 24.

The Soyuz TMA-21 spacecraft undocked from the International Space Station on September 16, 2011 at 00:38 UTC. Due to an apparent communications malfunction, voice communications from the crew were lost shortly after the deorbit burn, prompting some tense moments on the ground, but otherwise the reentry and descent went perfectly. There was no immediate explanation for the communications drop out.

Soyuz Commander Aleksandr Samokutyayev and Flight Engineers Andrei Borisenko and Ronald Garan returned to Earth on September 16, 2011 at 03:59 UTC, landing on target in central Kazakhstan. Russian search and rescue teams, along with NASA flight surgeons and space station program managers, were standing by to help the Soyuz crew. Three Antonov airplanes, 14 Mil Mi-8 helicopters, and seven rescue vehicles took part in the search for the capsule. Samokutyayev was the first to be extracted out of the Soyuz descent module, followed by Garan and Borisenko. All three appeared relaxed and in good health as they rested in recliners near the descent module. After quick medical examinations inside a nearby erected tent, the crew were flown to Karaganda for an official welcome home ceremony. From there Samokutyaev and Borisenko flew to Star City near Moscow while Garan boarded a NASA jet to fly back to the Johnson Space Center in Houston.

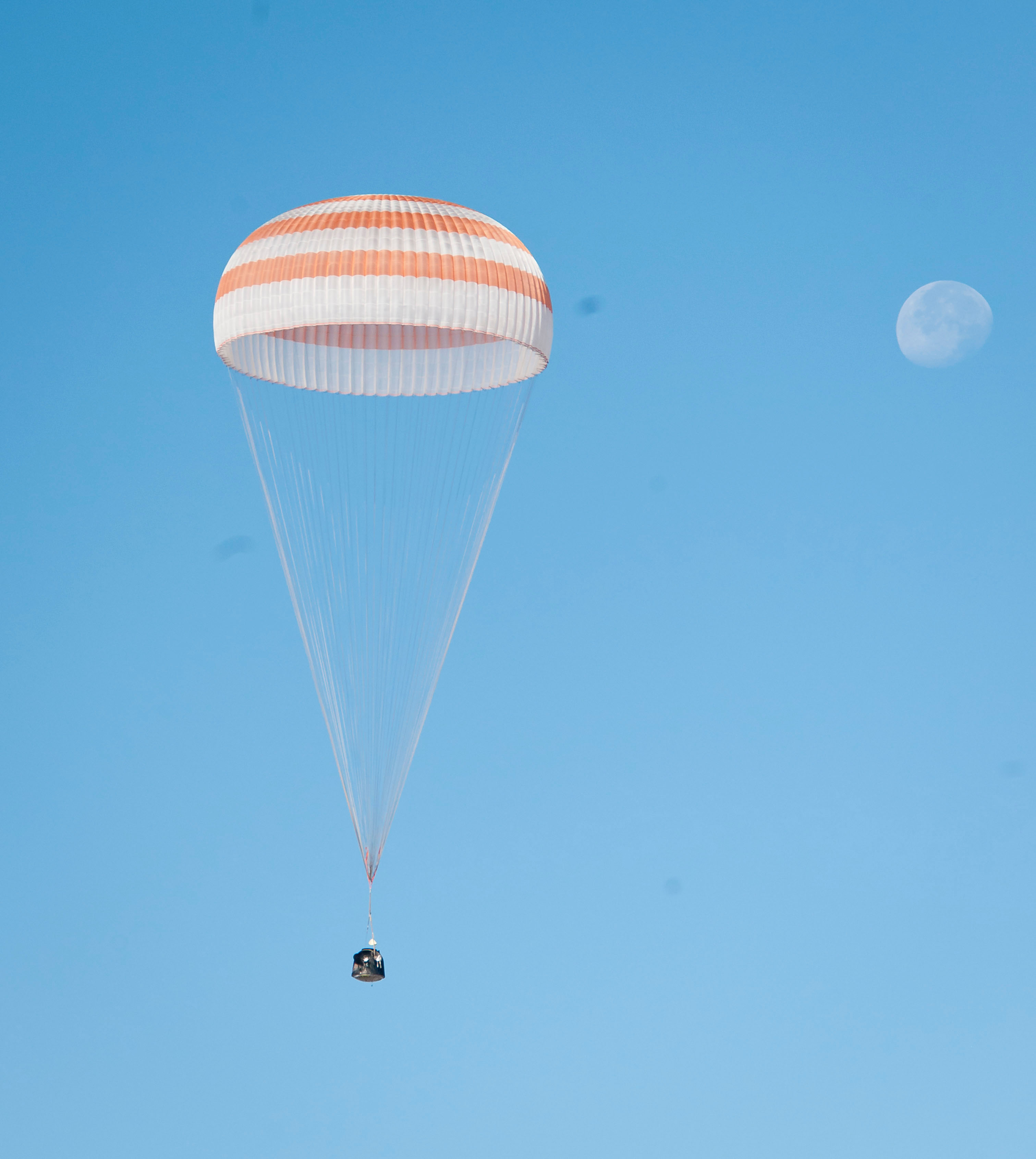
The Soyuz TMA-21 capsule descends toward landing.

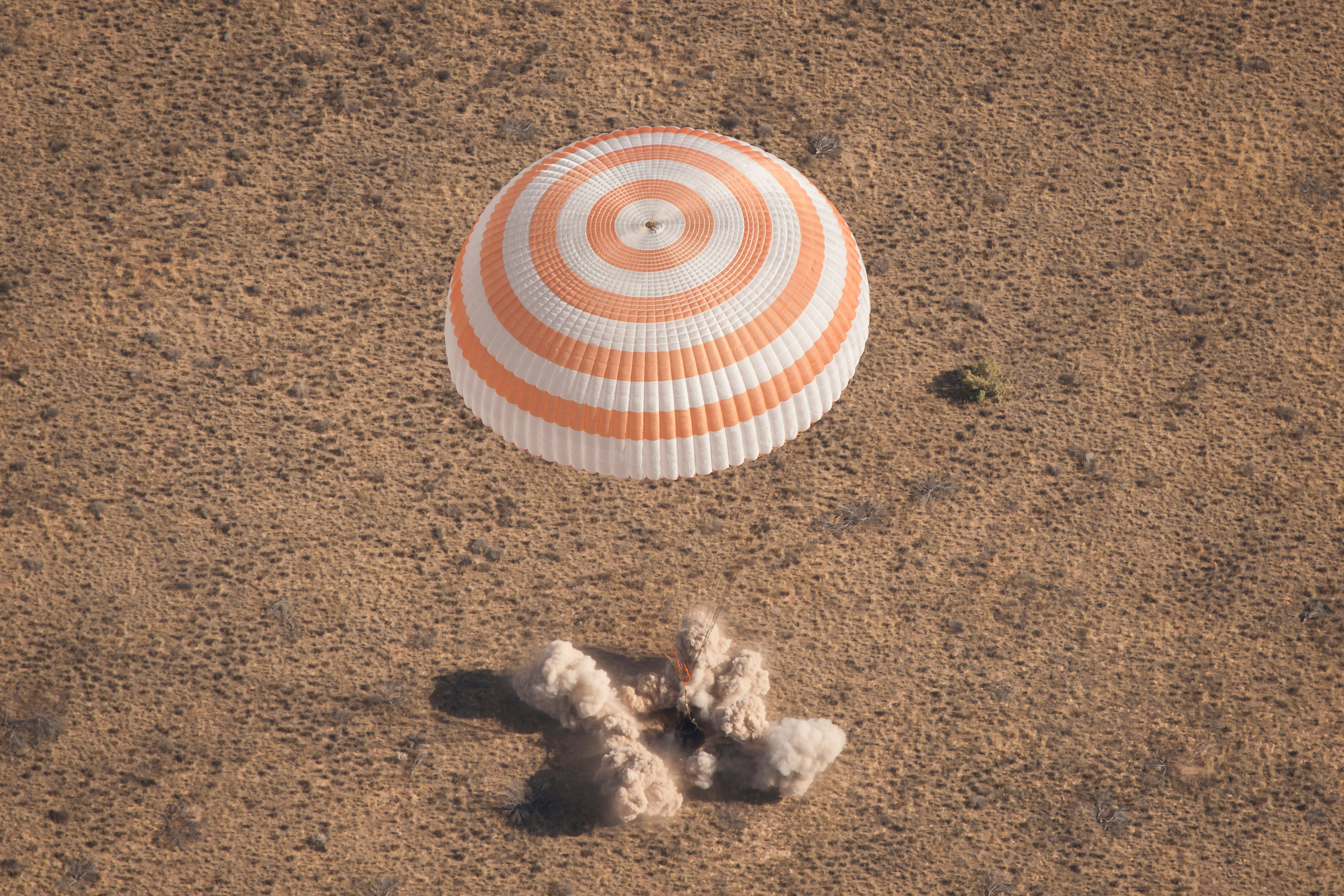
The Soyuz TMA-21 spacecraft lands in central Kazakhstan.

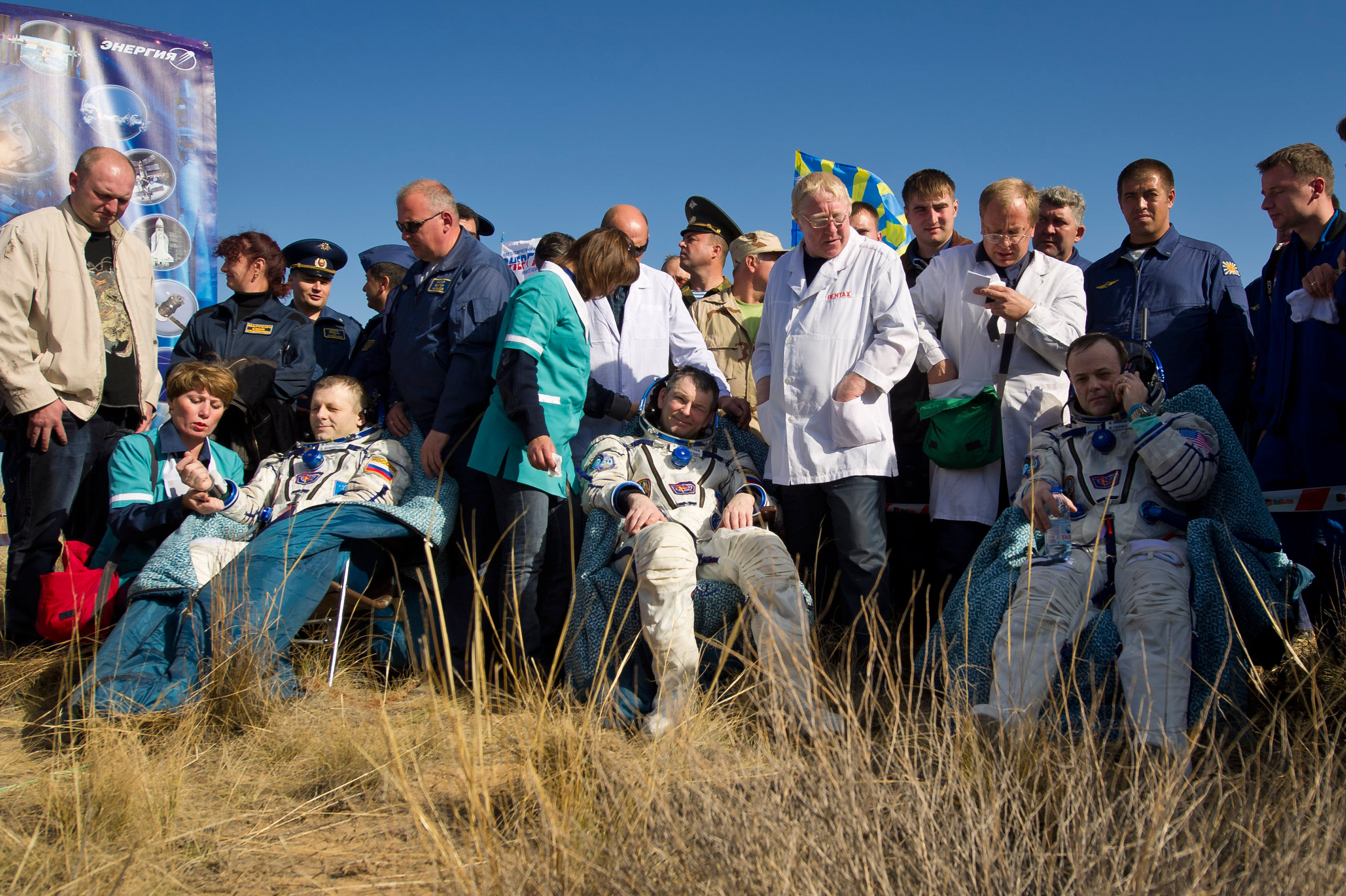
The Soyuz crew is pictured shortly after landing.

== Call sign ==
The crew of Soyuz TMA-21 selected Tarkhany as their call sign of respect for Mikhail Lermontov's work. Lermontov grew up in the village of Tarkhany (in the Penza Governorate), which now preserves his remains. Year 2011 also marks the 170th anniversary of his fatal duel with fellow army officer Nikolai Martynov in 1841.
