= Progress M-10M =

Russian spacecraft

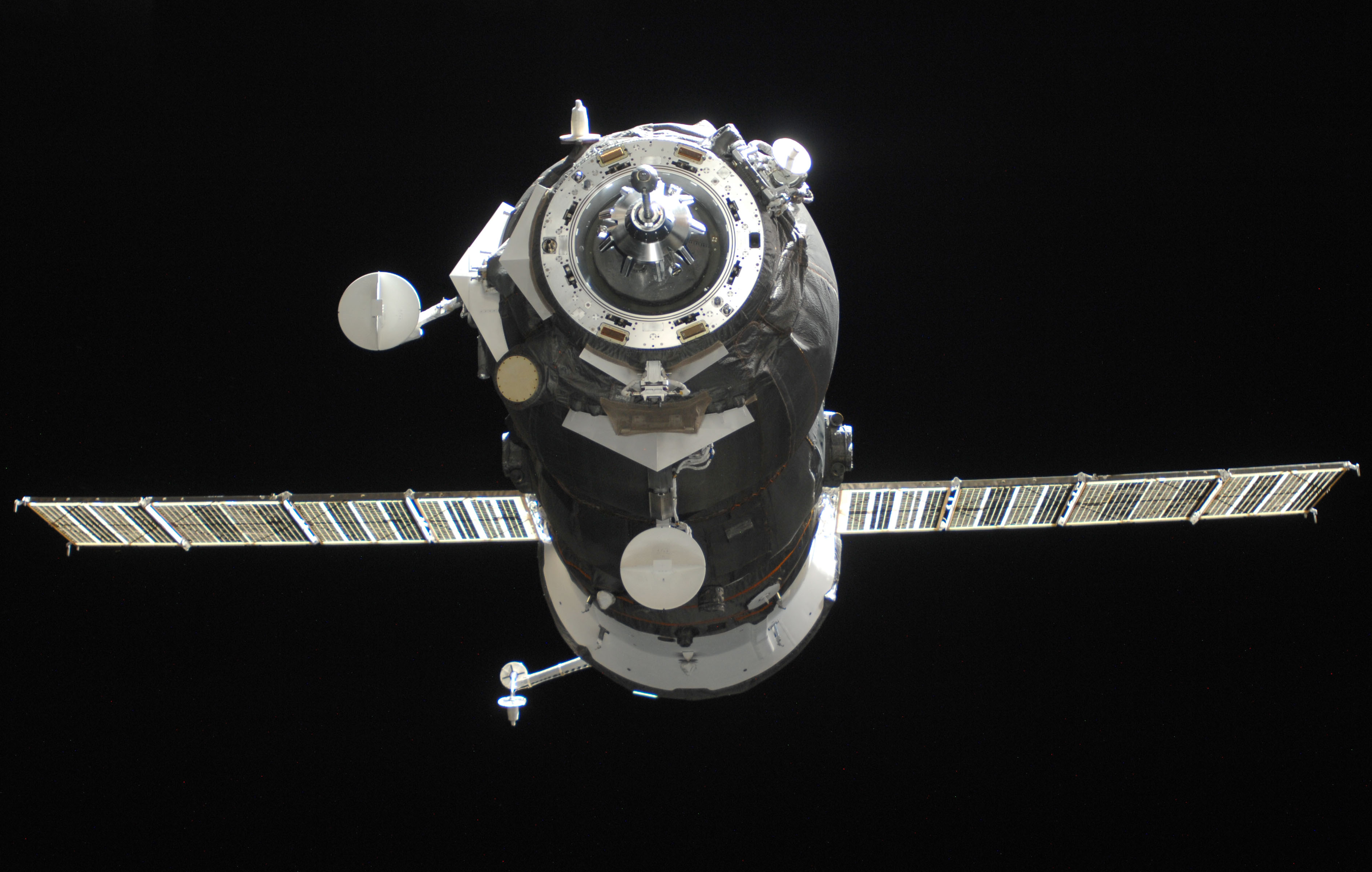
- Progress M-10M approaches the ISS on 29 April 2011.
- Mission type: ISS resupply
- Operator: Roskosmos
- COSPAR ID: 2011-017A
- SATCAT no.: 37396
- Mission duration: 185 days

Spacecraft properties
- Spacecraft type: Progress-M s/n 410
- Manufacturer: RKK Energia

Start of mission
- Launch date: 27 April 2011, 13:05:21 UTC
- Rocket: Soyuz-U
- Launch site: Baikonur, Site 1/5

End of mission
- Disposal: Deorbited
- Decay date: 29 October 2011, 13:00 UTC

Orbital parameters
- Reference system: Geocentric
- Regime: Low Earth
- Inclination: 51.6°
- Epoch: 27 April 2011

Docking with ISS
- Docking port: Pirs nadir
- Docking date: 29 April 2011, 14:29 UTC
- Undocking date: 29 October 2011, 09:04 UTC
- Time docked: 183 days

Cargo
- Mass: 2645 kg
- Pressurised: 1349 kg
- Fuel: 879 kg
- Gaseous: 50 kg
- Water: 420 kg
- Progress ISS Resupply

Progress 42P re-entering Earth's atmosphere.

Progress M-10M (Russian: Прогресс М-10М), identified by NASA as Progress 42P, is a Progress spacecraft which was launched on 27 April 2011 to resupply the International Space Station. It was the tenth Progress-M 11F615A60 spacecraft to be launched, and has the serial number 410. The spacecraft was manufactured by RKK Energia, and is operated by the Russian Federal Space Agency. On 29 April 2011, it arrived at the space station's Pirs Docking Compartment during Expedition 27.

== Launch ==
Progress M-10M lifted off from launch pad number 1 of the Baikonur cosmodrome at 13:05 UTC on 27 April 2011. Progress M-10M achieved the preliminary planned orbit after nine minutes of the launch. Onboard commands were issued to unfurl the spacecraft's communications and navigation antennas and extend two power-generating solar arrays. A series of engine firings over the next two days guided the spacecraft toward a linkup with the International Space Station (ISS).

== Docking ==
Progress M-10M autonomously flew for two days after the launch and arrived at the ISS on 29 April 2011, successfully docking to the nadir port of the Pirs at 14:19 UTC. The docking occurred as the two spacecraft were traveling 354 kilometres over western Mongolia. The linkup happened just over five hours before NASA's first launch attempt of the Space Shuttle Endeavour on STS-134 mission. The shuttle launch was scrubbed because two heaters on one of Endeavour's auxiliary power units failed.

== Cargo ==
=== Inventory ===
Total cargo mass delivered: 2645 kg

Item description	Mass (kg)
Propellant in the propulsion system tanks for the ISS needs	250
Propellant in the refuelling system tanks	627
Oxygen	51
Water in the Rodnik system tanks	420
Items in the cargo compartment	1297
Gas supply system	24
Water supply system	20
Thermal control system	14
On-board hardware control system	12
Individual protection items	62
Maintenance and repair equipment	10
Sanitary and hygienic items	118
Food containers, fresh products	192
Medical equipment, linen, personal hygienic and prophylactics items	94
Science experimental hardware, including experimental items	141
Russian crew's items	88
On-board documentation files, crew provisions, video- and photo-equipment	22
FGB-hardware	54
US Orbital Segment hardware	444

== Undocking and decay ==
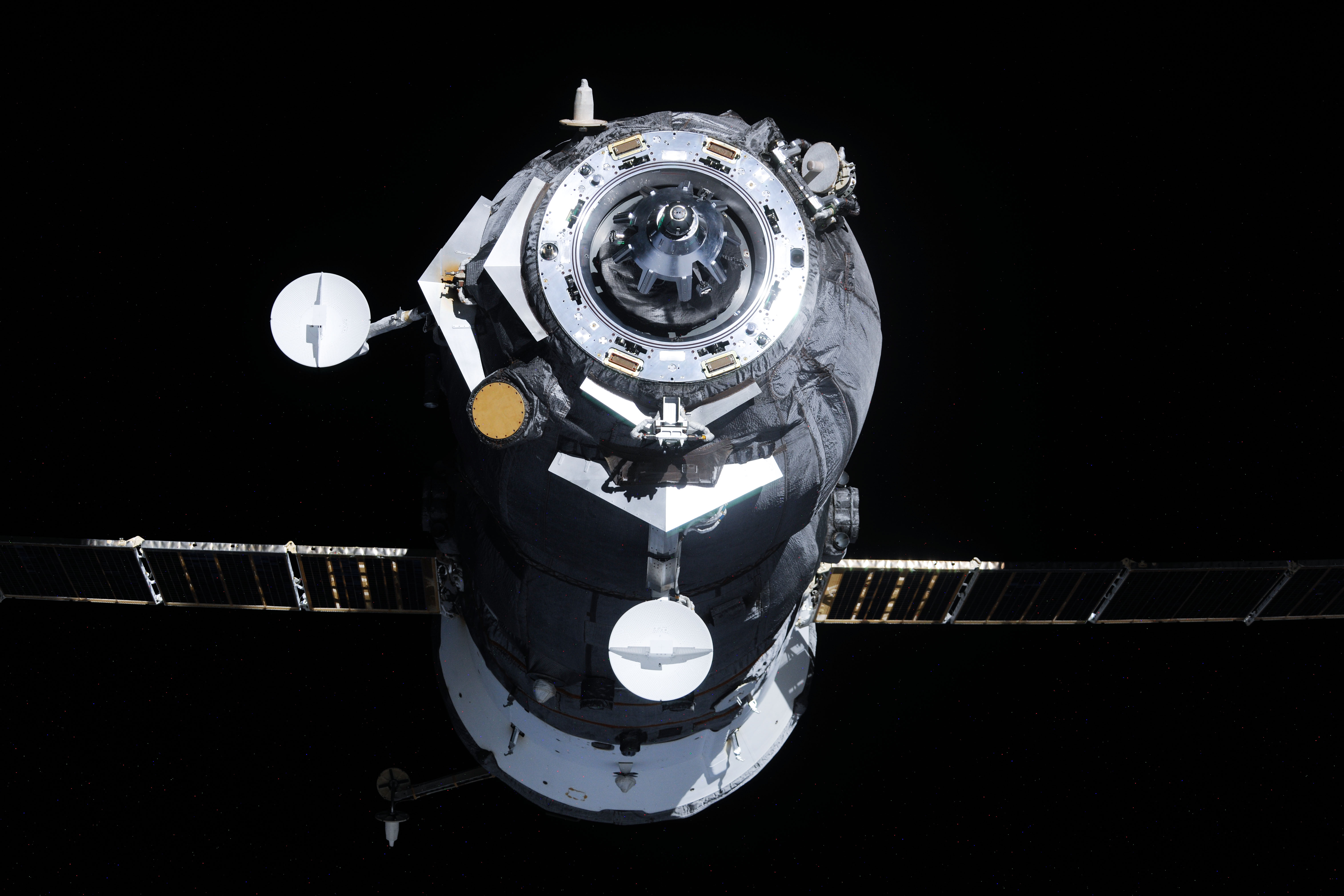
Progress M-10M departs the ISS on 29 October 2011.

Progress M-10M undocked nominally at 09:04 UTC on 29 October 2011 from the nadir port of the Pirs Docking Compartment after hooks open command at 09:01 UTC. An automated 15 seconds separation burn followed at 09:07 UTC. The cargo ship, loaded with trash, performed its 3-minute deorbit burn at 12:10:30 UTC. It entered the Earth's atmosphere at 12:48 UTC and burned up at 12:54 UTC. Surviving debris impacted in the Pacific Ocean at around 13:00 UTC.

With the Progress M-10M undocking, the Space Station was in a very rare configuration of having only one Russian vehicle docked (Soyuz TMA-02M at Rassvet Module). The last time this situation occurred was in March 2009.
