= European Transportation Carrier =

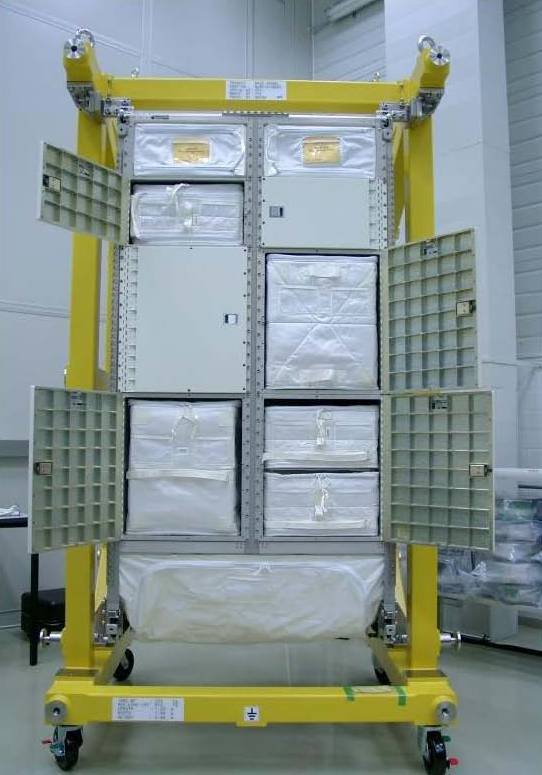
The European Transportation Carrier is shown with stowage bags (white) visible in the open cabinets. Image courtesy of ESA.

The European Transportation Carrier (ETC) transports various payload items, such as commissioning items, science instruments, consumables, orbital support equipment, orbital replacement units, and resupply items, and science items, such as containers. This applies especially to European payload items that cannot be launched in their payload's rack due to limited stowage and transportation capabilities. On orbit, the ETC serves as a workbench and stowage facility, supporting the Biolab, Fluid Science Laboratory (FSL), European Physiology Module (EPM), and European Drawer Rack (EDR).

Since its first use in the Columbus laboratory, the ETC has been used as a transport rack within the multi-purpose logistics module (MPLM). It allows for regular supply and return of all experiment and service items needed for continuous operation of the European payload facilities inside the Columbus module.

The ETC can carry up to 410 kg (881 lb) of payload and experiment items, accommodated in standardized cargo transfer bags (CTBs). They are compatible with the ISS standards for transport in the MPLM and Automated Transfer Vehicle (ATV) and the use on board the ISS partner modules like Destiny, Kibo, and Columbus.

The ETC is equipped with six rigged stowage containers in optimized sizes. There are two smaller containers of 6 PU (1 PU = Panel Unit = 44–45 mm in height) for full and half-sized CTBs and four 12 PU containers that can be filled with any combination of CTBs, up to triple size.

In addition, the ETC is equipped with three zero-gravity stowage pockets, one on the bottom and two on the top. These pockets extend the stowage volume capacity to 1000 L instead of the standard 800 L, but can be used and filled only in weightlessness.

== Operations ==
The European Transportation Carrier (ETC) was launched inside the European Space Agency's Columbus module as part of the STS-122/1E mission. Initially, it served as a workbench and stowage center in the Columbus module. After its initial use, it was loaded with items to be returned to Earth and reused for other missions. The ETC is designed to provide support for 15 missions.

== See also ==
Scientific research on the ISS

== Gallery ==
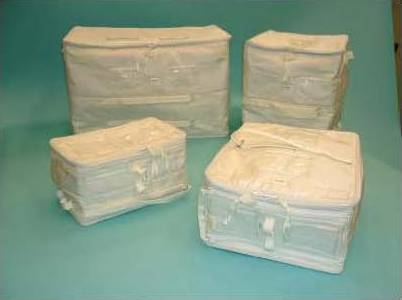
Different sizes of Cargo Transport Bags are used in the European Transportation Carrier.
