= Combustion Integrated Rack =

Experiment facility on the International Space Station

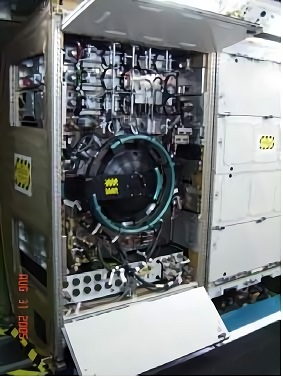
The training unit with the rack doors open in Payload Development Laboratory II at Johnson Space Center, Houston, Texas.

The Combustion Integrated Rack (CIR) is an experiment facility installed in the International Space Station (ISS). It includes an optics bench, combustion chamber, fuel and oxidizer control, and five different cameras for performing combustion experiments in microgravity.

The Fluids and Combustion Facility (FCF) accommodates the unique challenges of working with fluids and combustion processes in microgravity and provides services and capabilities comparable to those found in traditional Earth-based laboratories. The FCF occupies two powered racks on the ISS: the Combustion Integrated Rack (CIR) and the Fluids Integrated Rack (FIR). The FCF is a permanent modular, multi-user facility that accommodates microgravity science experiments on board the ISS. The FCF supports sustained, systematic research in the disciplines of fluid physics and combustion science.

The CIR is used to perform combustion experiments in microgravity. The CIR can be reconfigured easily on orbit to accommodate a variety of combustion experiments. It consists of an optics bench, a combustion chamber, a fuel and oxidizer management system, environmental management systems, and interfaces for science diagnostics and experiment specific equipment. For diagnostic purposes, five different cameras are available for use by the investigator. The CIR features a 100-litre combustion chamber surrounded by optical equipment and diagnostic packages, including a gas chromatograph. Experiments are conducted by remote control from the Glenn Research Center (GRC) Telescience Support Center (TSC).

The CIR has been designed for use with the Passive Rack Isolation System (PaRIS), which connects the rack to the ISS structure using eight spring-damper isolators and a special set of umbilicals. Modelling and analysis show that the PaRIS can attenuate much of the U.S. Laboratory's vibration and provide a much quieter environment than a simple hard-mounted rack. The CIR is the only combustion research facility on board the ISS.

== Facility Operations ==
The Combustion Integrated Rack (CIR) chamber can operate at low (0.02 atm) or high (up to 3 atm) atmospheric pressures. Tools are not required to open the chamber or change or service the eight windows on the chamber. Gases are delivered through the bottles on the front of the rack. The exhaust package features a filter that can recycle the gas used or convert it to an expellable gas. The CIR can be used to explore droplet, solid fuel, and gaseous fuel combustion.

== See also ==
- Scientific research on the ISS

== Gallery ==
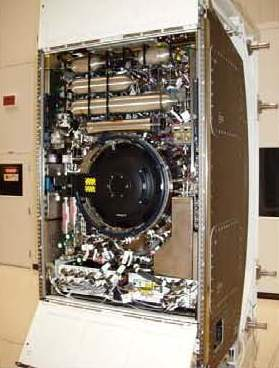
The Combustion Integrated Rack flight unit at Glenn Research Center, Cleveland, Ohio.

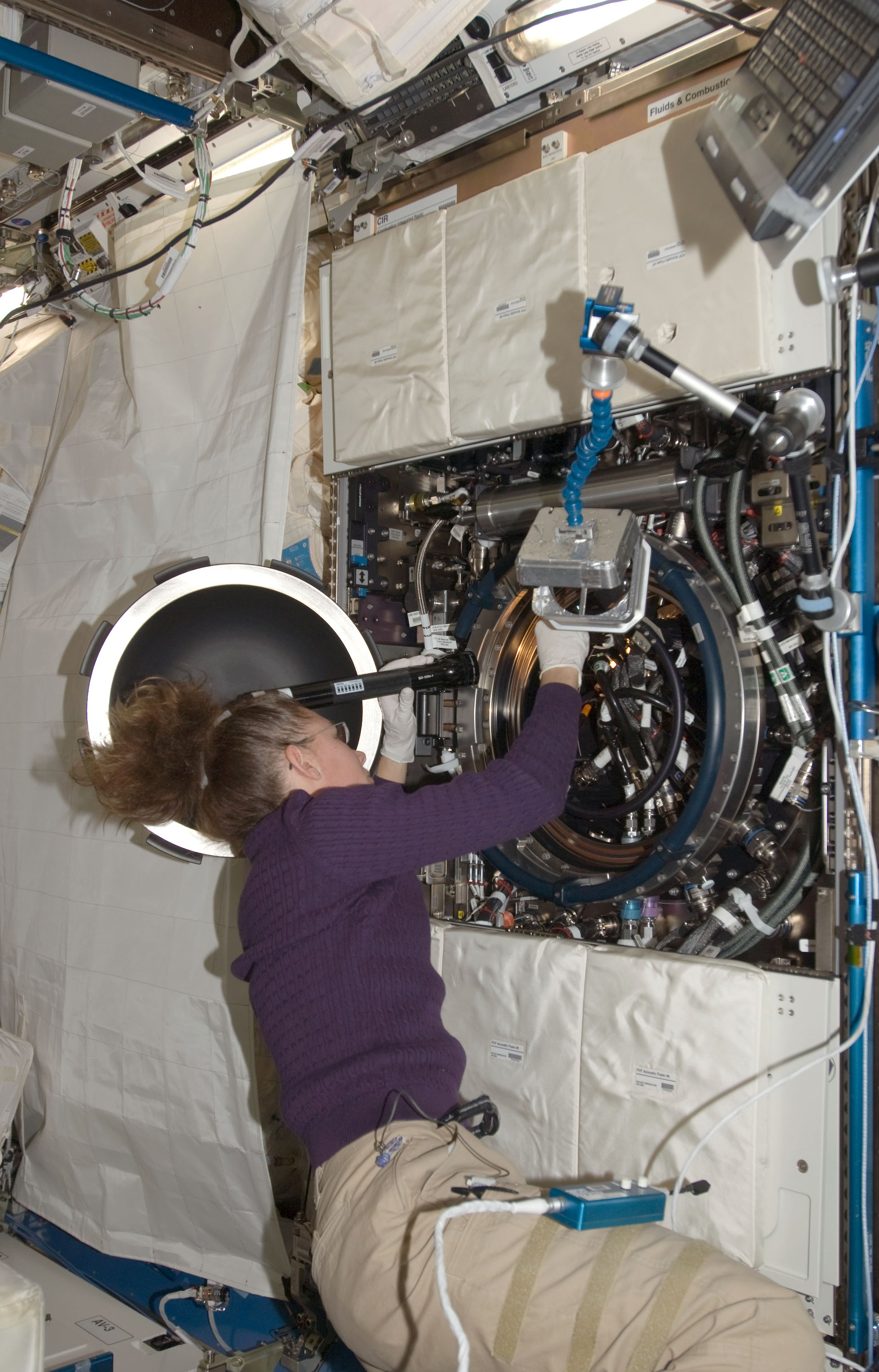
Sandra Magnus as she works with the Combustion Integrated Rack (CIR) in the U.S. Laboratory, Destiny, during maintenance.

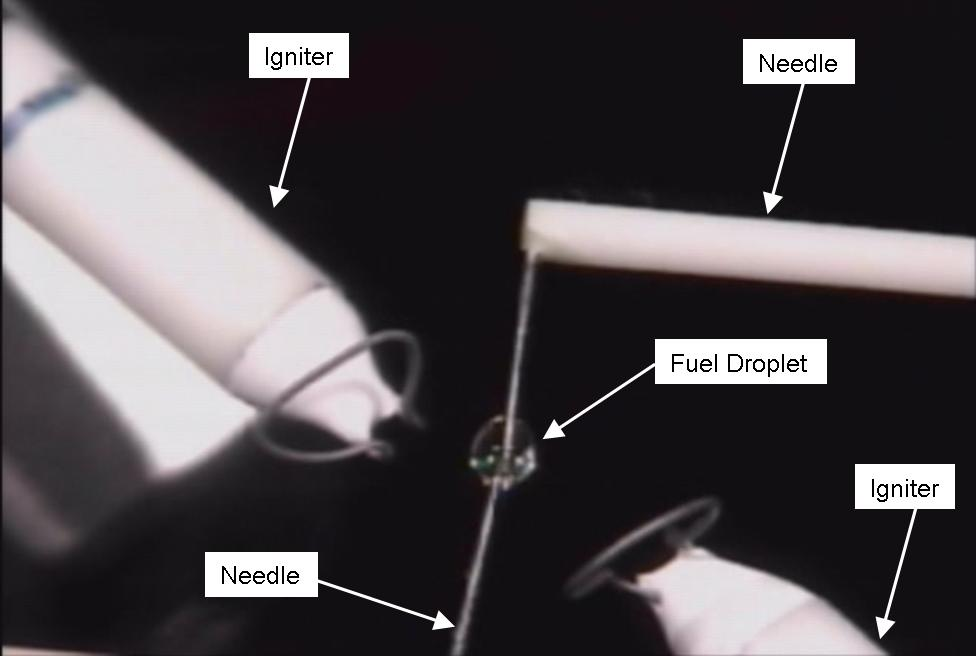
Video screen shot of Multiuser Droplet Combustion Apparatus Flame Extinguishment Experiment (MDCA-FLEX) Ignition 1 on March 5, 2009, (GMT 64/17:21) inside the Combustion Integrated Rack. The methanol fuel droplet is being formed on the tip of a needle (droplet size approximately 2.5 mm). Image courtesy of NASA.

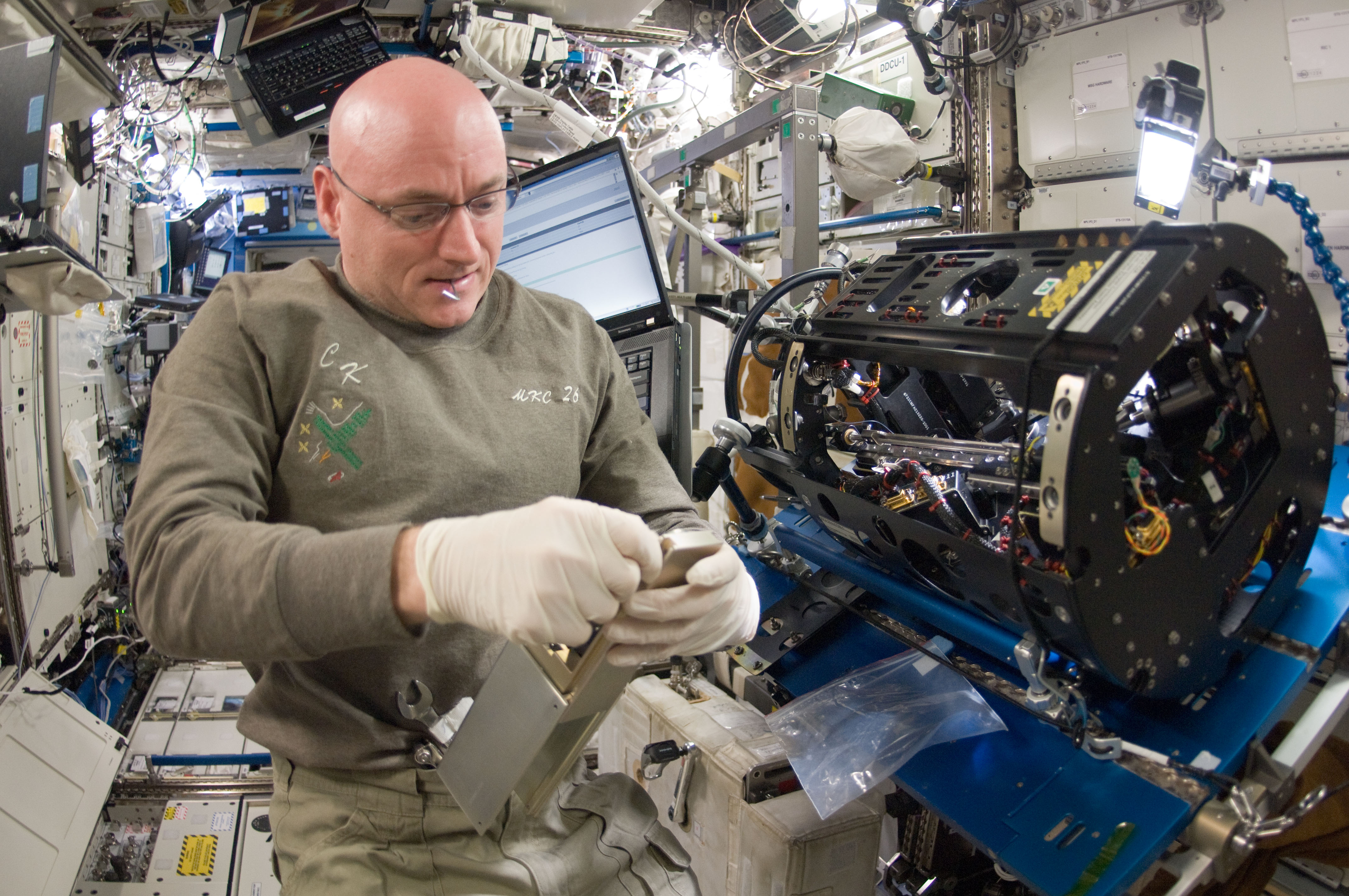
NASA astronaut Scott Kelly, Expedition 26 commander, works on the Combustion Integrated Rack (CIR) Multi-user Drop Combustion Apparatus (MDCA) in the Destiny laboratory of the International Space Station.

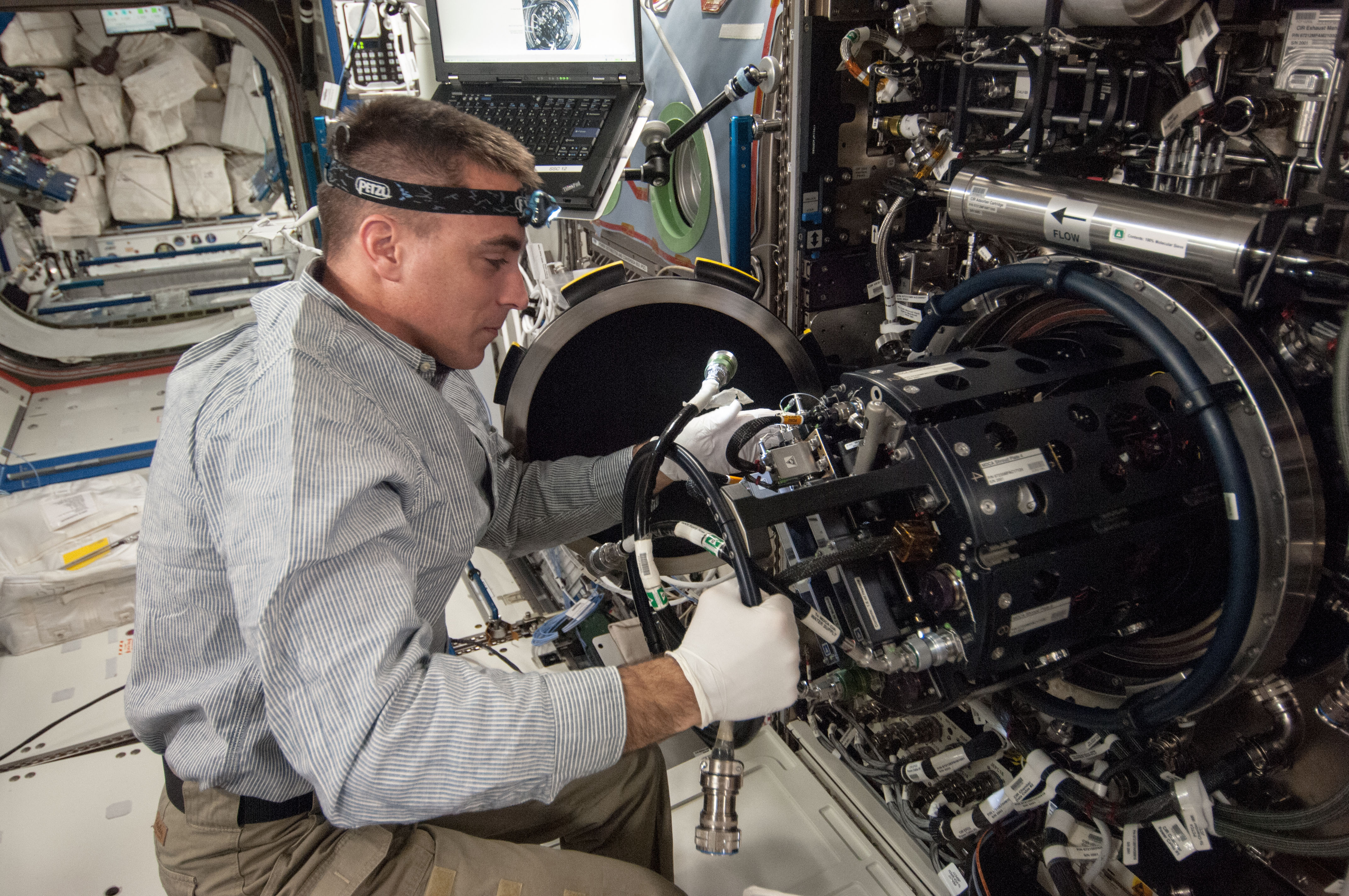
Expedition 35 Flight Engineer Chris Cassidy removes and replaces one of the Fuel Reservoirs with the MDCA Chamber Insert Assembly (CIA)

3mm droplet of heptane burning in microgravity as part of the FLEX experiment conducted in the Combustion Integrated Rack on the ISS. Atmosphere is 33.4% oxygen (balance nitrogen) at a pressure of 0.713 atm. This back-lit view shows the droplet as it burns as well as small particles of soot which coalesce. The flame itself is generally not visible.
