= Microgravity Science Glovebox =

ISS charge

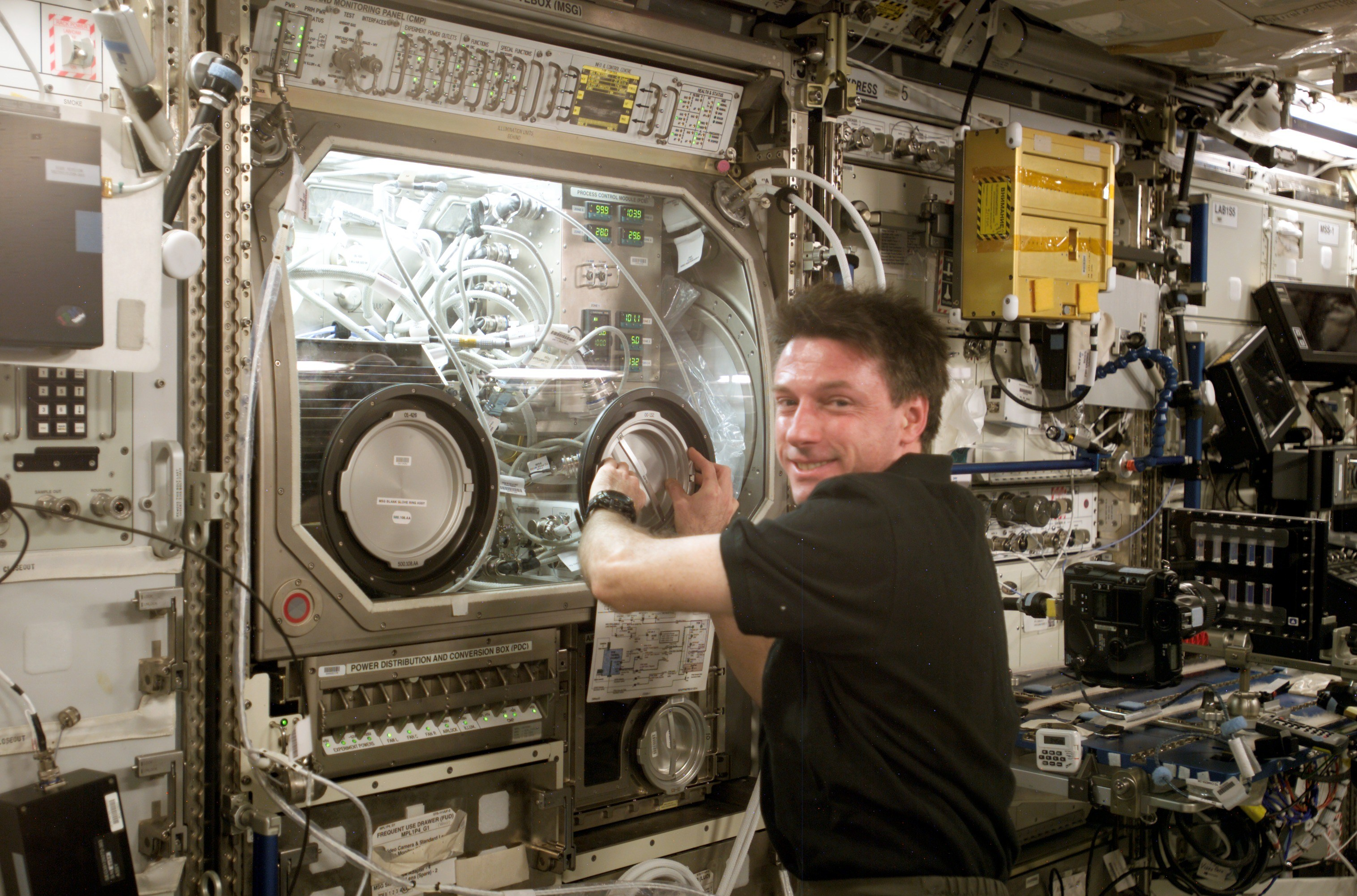
NASA Image: ISS008E20622 - Expedition 8 Commander and Science Officer Michael Foale conducts an inspection of the Microgravity Science Glovebox.

The Microgravity Science Glovebox (MSG) is a glovebox aboard the International Space Station (ISS). It provides a safe contained environment for research with liquids, combustion and hazardous materials in the microgravity conditions of the ISS. Without the MSG, many types of hands-on investigations would be impossible or severely limited on board the Station. The Microgravity Science Glovebox (MSG) occupies a floor-to-ceiling rack inside the Destiny module of the ISS. It is more than twice as large as gloveboxes flown on the Space Shuttle and could contain larger investigations that are about twice the size of an airline carry-on bag. A follow-on sister facility, managed by the same group at Marshall Space Flight Center, is intended to further support biological experiments with the Life Sciences Glovebox.

== Description ==
The Core Facility of MSG occupies the upper half of the overall rack and includes the large work volume (WV), an airlock and electronics for control, housekeeping and investigation resources. The WV holds the experiment and related equipment. The work volume is approximately 3 feet (910 mm) wide, 2 feet (610 mm) high, and 1.5 feet (460 mm) deep with a usable volume of about 255 litres. This area can be sealed and held at a negative pressure, isolating the crew and the Station from possible hazards associated with the investigations that are taking place inside.

An airlock under the WV can be accessed to bring objects in safely while other activities are going on inside MSG. The MSG has 40 cm diameter side ports (equipped with rugged gloves that are sealed to prevent leaks) for setting up and manipulating equipment in the WV. A cold-plate provides cooling for experiment hardware and the air can be continuously circulated and filtered. Experiments are provided with 1 kW of power and cooling.

Vacuum, venting, nitrogen gas dilution (that can keep the work volume oxygen volume fraction below the standard ISS atmosphere (nominally 21% by volume) down to 10 percent or less), power and data interfaces are also provided within MSG. A video system consists of a self-standing subsystem of four colour cameras, two monitors, two analogue recorders and two digital recorders integrated into an International Sub-rack Interface Standard (ISIS) drawer. The command and monitoring panel monitors the facility status and performance and provides for manual operation of MSG by the crew.

MSG was delivered to ISS during Expedition 5, whereupon it was installed in the Destiny module. On March 21, 2008, during Expedition 16, MSG was relocated to the Columbus module. On October 21, 2010, during Expedition 25, MSG was transferred back to the Destiny module.

== Description Summary ==
- The Microgravity Science Glovebox (MSG) makes it possible to do investigations in microgravity that are similar to those carried out in ground-based laboratories. Without containment, liquids and particles involved in experiments on board the Space Station would float about the cabin. This could cause damage to equipment or harm the crew.
- Crewmembers access the work area through ports equipped with rugged, sealed gloves that can be removed when contaminants are not present. A video system and data downlinks allow for control of the enclosed experiments from the ground, if desired.
- In addition to doing complete, laboratory-like experiments, the MSG allows scientists to test small parts of larger investigations in a microgravity environment and to try out new equipment in microgravity.
- The MSG can support all key areas of microgravity research as well as other scientific fields. This makes it a useful laboratory resource for scientists in many different fields conducting a wide variety of investigations.

== Operations ==
The MSG accommodates small and medium-sized investigations from any disciplines including biotechnology, combustion science, life sciences, fluid physics, fundamental physics and materials science. Many of these experiments use chemicals, burning or molten materials or other hazards that must be contained.

== Results ==
The MSG on the ISS was utilized until 2010 for a large body of research. The MSG had operated on orbit for more than 3500 hours by 2010; used by various types of investigations, including material science, thermal management, protein crystal growth, life sciences, fire detection, combustion and technology demonstration. The versatility of the resources MSG provides makes it an ideal platform for microgravity research (Spivey 2006 - 2008).

== See also ==
- Scientific research on the ISS

== Gallery ==
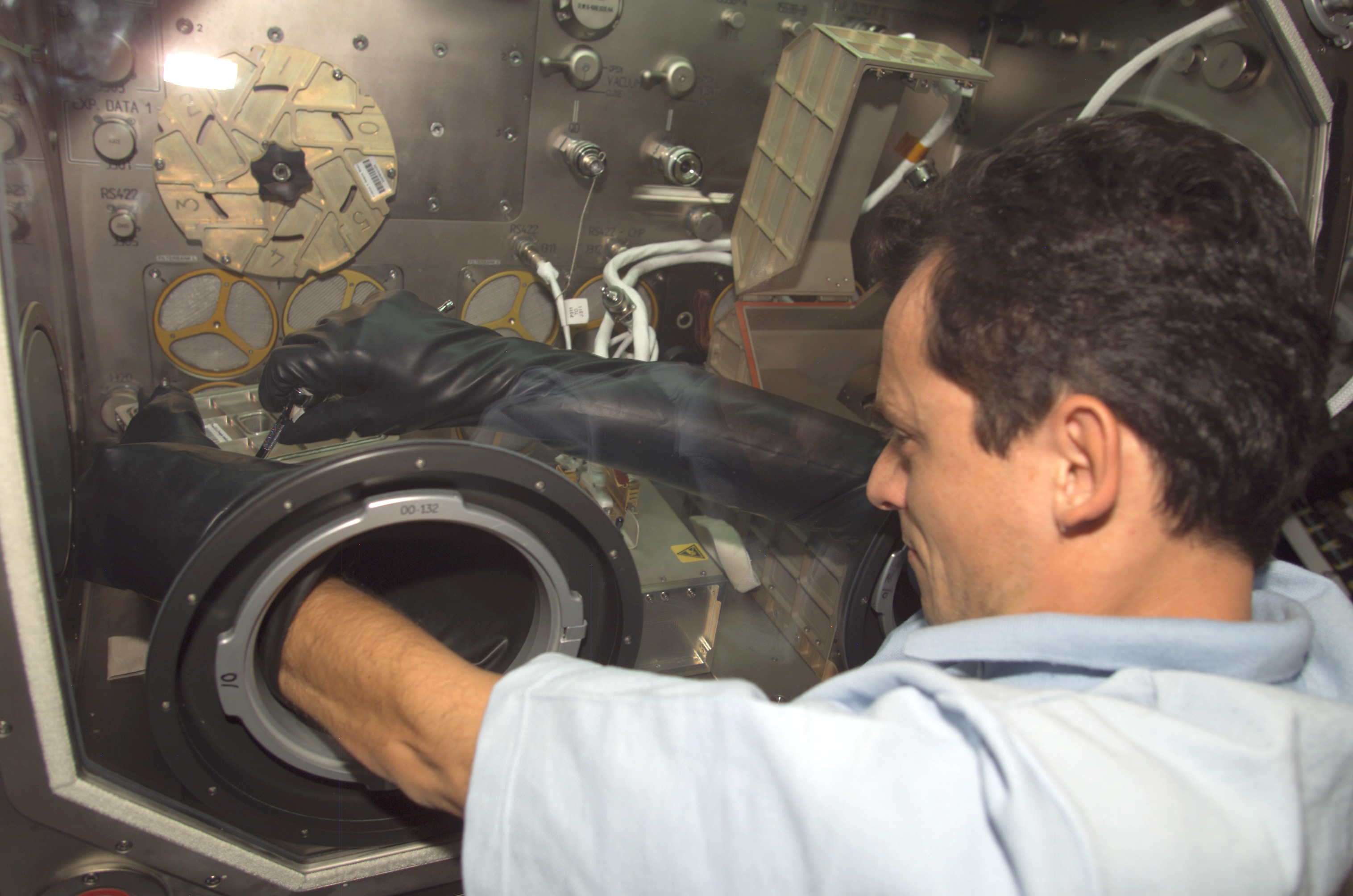
Over the shoulder view of European Space Agency (ESA) Astronaut Pedro Duque as he works at the Microgravity Science Glovebox for the Cervantes mission experiment PromISS 2 in the Destiny U.S. Laboratory during joint operations with the Expedition 7 and Expedition 8 crews.

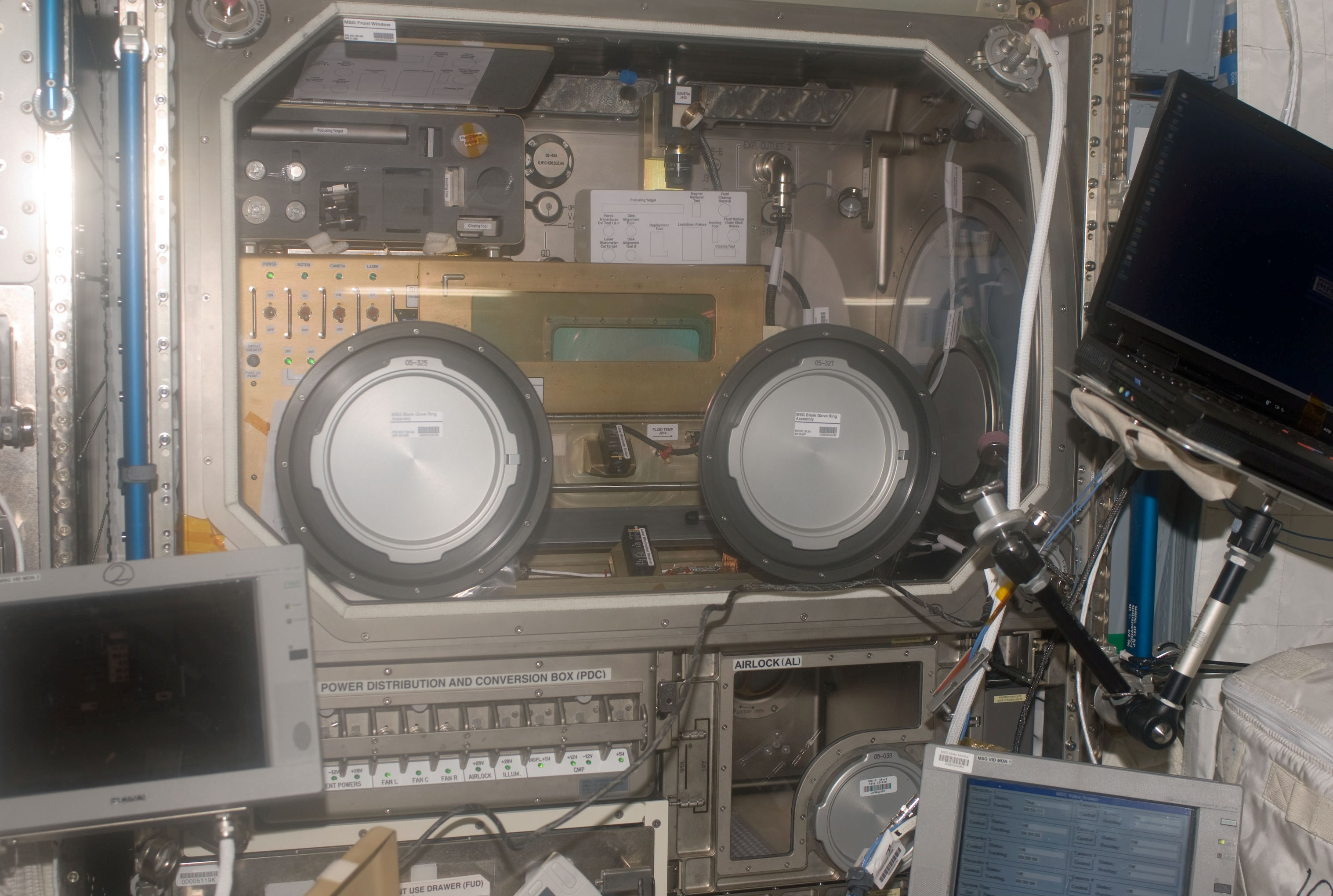
View of the Microgravity Sciences Glovebox (MSG) with the Shear History Extensional Rheology Experiment (SHERE) inside
