= Scientific research on the International Space Station =

Overview article

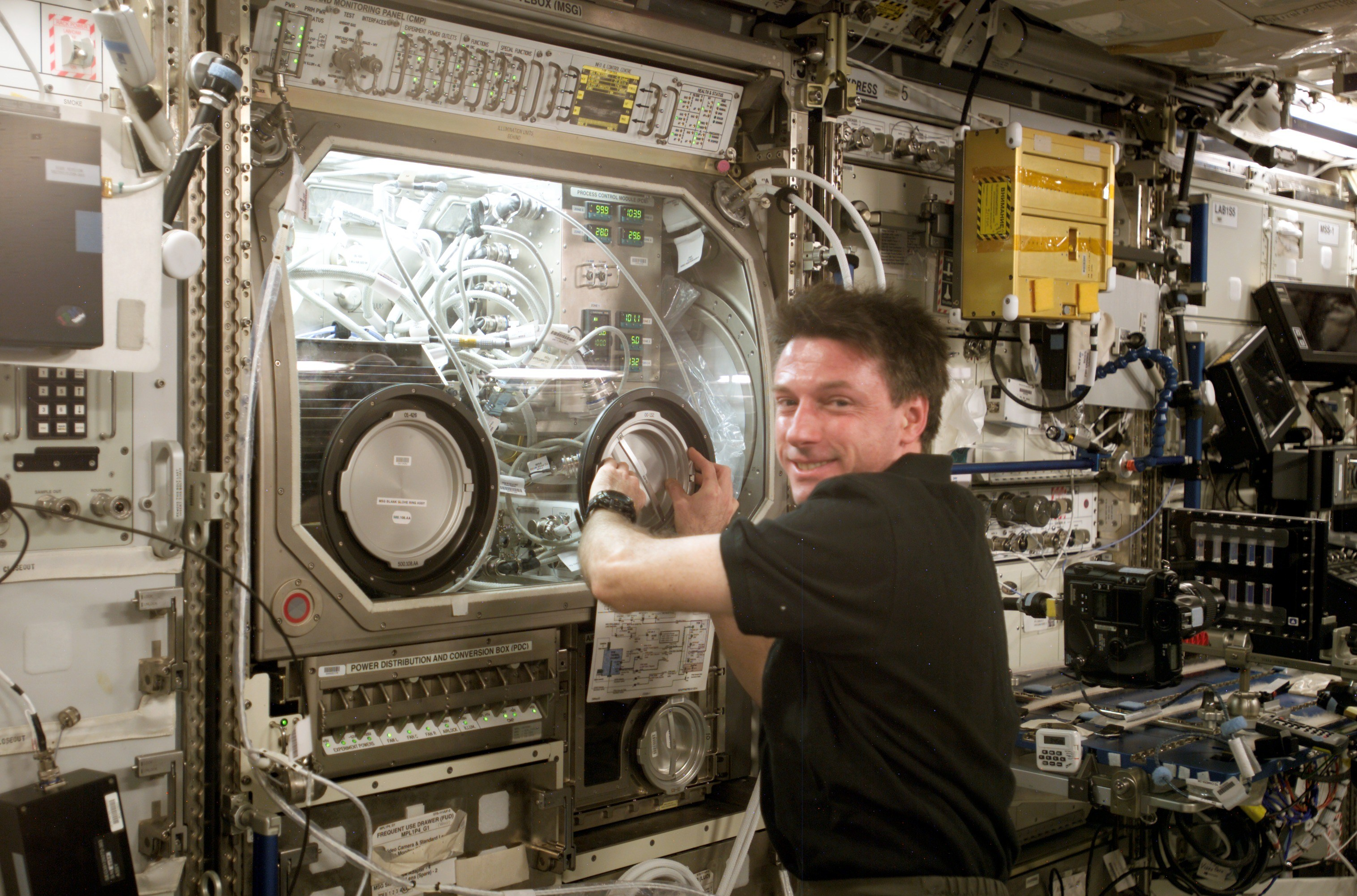
Expedition 8 Commander and Science Officer Michael Foale conducts an inspection of the Microgravity Science Glovebox.

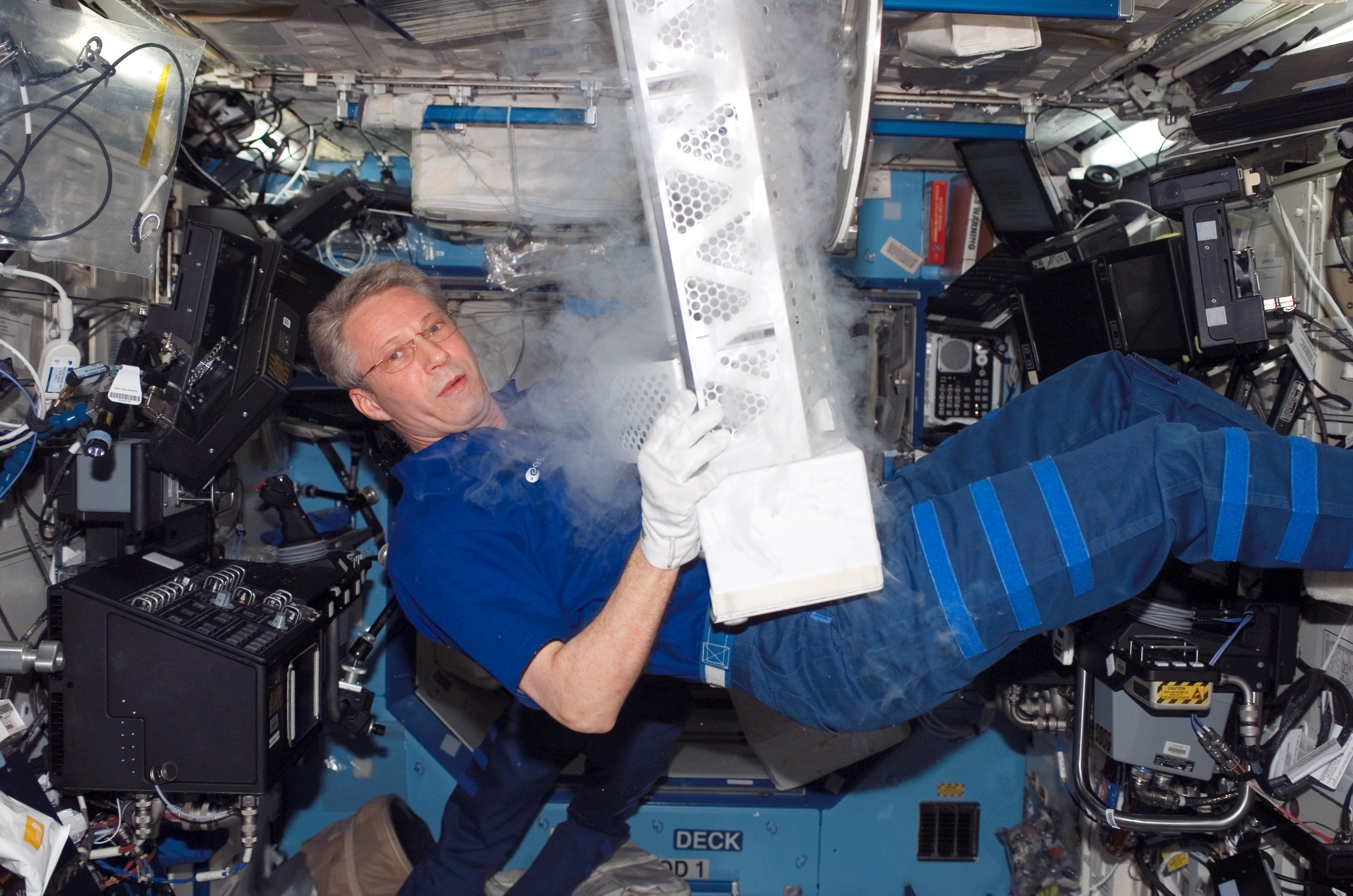
ESA astronaut Thomas Reiter, STS-116 mission specialist, works with the Passive Observatories for Experimental Microbial Systems in Micro-G (POEMS) payload in the Minus Eighty Degree Laboratory Freezer for ISS (MELFI) inside the Destiny laboratory.

The International Space Station is a platform for scientific research that requires one or more of the unusual conditions present in low Earth orbit (for example microgravity, (cosmic) -radiation and extreme temperatures). The primary fields of research include human research, space medicine, life sciences, physical sciences, astronomy and meteorology. The 2005 NASA Authorization Act designated the American segment of the International Space Station as a national laboratory with the goal of increasing the use of the ISS by other federal agencies and the private sector. Released research has been presented and maid available through the ISS National Laboratory, summarized annually by NASA.

Research on the ISS improves knowledge about the effects of long-term space exposure on the human body. Subjects currently under study include muscle atrophy, bone loss, and fluid shift. The data will be used to determine whether space colonization and lengthy human spaceflight are feasible. As of 2006, data on bone loss and muscular atrophy suggest that there would be a significant risk of fractures and movement problems if astronauts landed on a planet after a lengthy interplanetary cruise (such as the six-month journey time required to fly to Mars). Large scale medical studies are conducted aboard the ISS via the National Space Biomedical Research Institute (NSBRI). Prominent among these is the Advanced Diagnostic Ultrasound in Microgravity study in which astronauts (including former ISS Commanders Leroy Chiao and Gennady Padalka) perform ultrasound scans under the guidance of remote experts. The study considers the diagnosis and treatment of medical conditions in space. Usually, there is no physician on board the ISS, and diagnosis of medical conditions is a challenge. It is anticipated that remotely guided ultrasound scans will have application on Earth in emergency and rural care situations where access to a trained physician is difficult.

Researchers are investigating the effect of the station's near-weightless environment on the evolution, development, growth and internal processes of plants and animals. In response to some of this data, NASA wants to investigate microgravity's effects on the growth of three-dimensional, human-like tissues, and the unusual protein crystals that can be formed in space.

The investigation of the physics of fluids in microgravity will allow researchers to model the behaviour of fluids better. Because fluids can be almost completely combined in microgravity, physicists investigate fluids that do not mix well on Earth. In addition, an examination of reactions that are slowed by low gravity and temperatures will give scientists a deeper understanding of superconductivity.

The study of materials science is an important ISS research activity, with the objective of reaping economic benefits through the improvement of techniques used on the ground. Other areas of interest include the effect of the low gravity environment on combustion, through the study of the efficiency of burning and control of emissions and pollutants. These findings may improve our knowledge about energy production, and lead to economic and environmental benefits.

Remote sensing of the Earth, astronomy, and deep space research on the ISS have significantly increased during the 2010s after the completion of the US Orbital Segment in 2011. Throughout the more than 20 years of the ISS program researchers aboard the ISS and on the ground have examined aerosols, ozone, water vapor, and oxides in Earth's atmosphere, as well as the Sun, cosmic rays, cosmic dust, antimatter, and dark matter in the universe. Examples of Earth-viewing remote sensing experiments that have flown on the ISS are the Orbiting Carbon Observatory 3, ISS-RapidScat, HICO, ECOSTRESS, the Global Ecosystem Dynamics Investigation, and the Cloud Aerosol Transport System. ISS-based astronomy telescopes and experiments include SOLAR, the Neutron Star Interior Composition Explorer, the Calorimetric Electron Telescope, the Monitor of All-sky X-ray Image (MAXI), and the Alpha Magnetic Spectrometer.

Since 2018, an example of automated manufacturing on the ISS is the testing across nine launches (as of April 2024) of a system to manufacture artificial retinas benefitted by the weightless environment. Progress has resulted in a goal of beginning human trials of the material as early as 2027.

== ISS science facilities ==
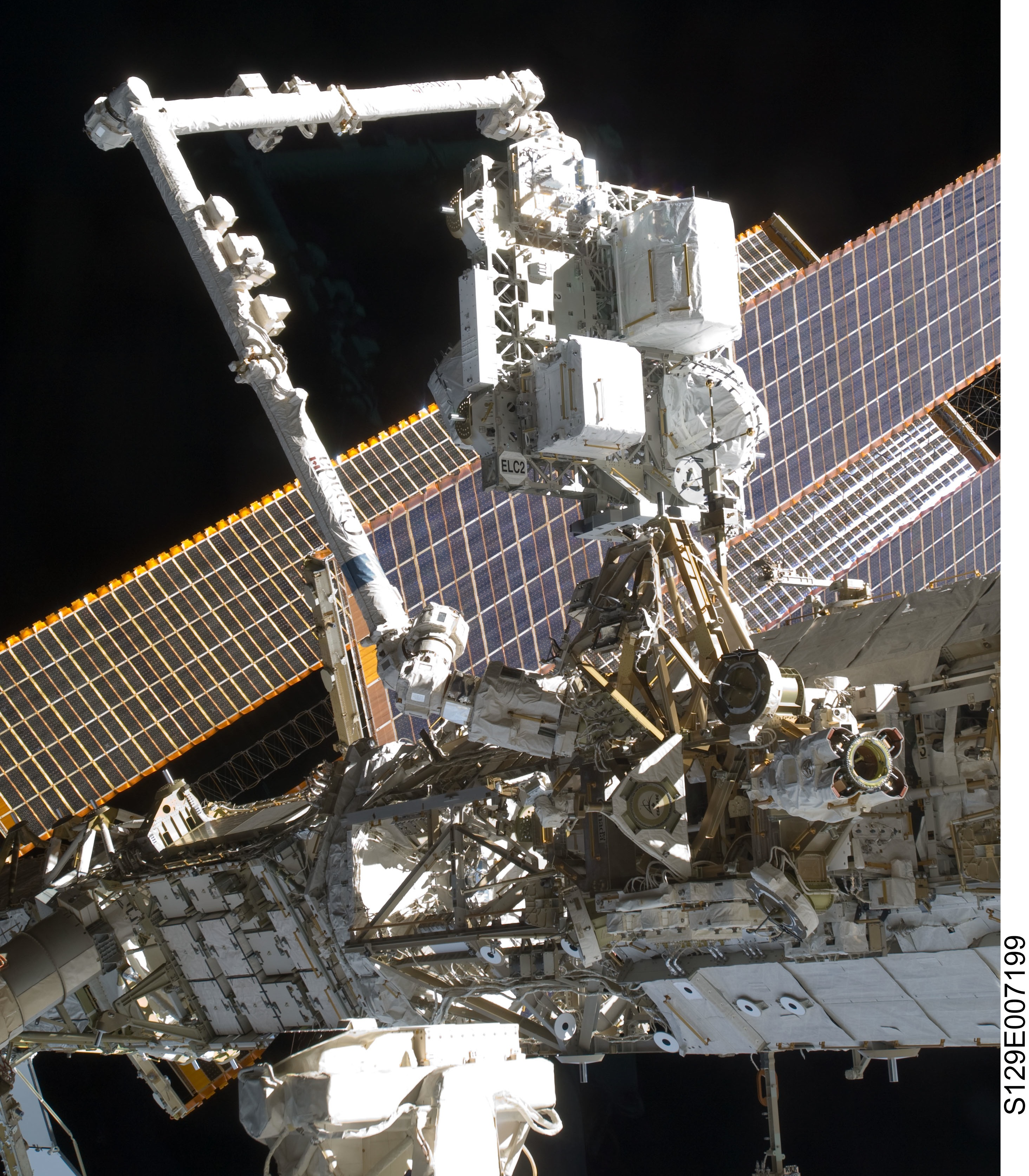

The ISS includes a number of modules devoted to scientific activity as well as other hardware designed for the same purpose.

Laboratory modules:

- Columbus
- Destiny
- Kibo or the Japanese Experiment Module
- Poisk or Mini-Research Module 2
- Rassvet or Mini-Research Module 1
- Nauka or Multipurpose Laboratory Module

Scientific hardware not attached to any laboratory module:

- Alpha Magnetic Spectrometer or AMS
- Cupola
- ExPRESS Logistics Carriers or ELC
- External Stowage Platforms (ESP)
- Orbital Replacement Units SPARES
- Neutron Star Interior Composition Explorer (NICER)

=== Columbus ===
Internal scientific hardware:

- Biological Experiment Laboratory (BioLab)
- European Drawer Rack (EDR)
- European Physiology Module (EPM)
- European Transportation Carrier (ETC)
- Fluid Science Laboratory (FSL)
- Microgravity Science Glovebox (MSG)
- Muscle Atrophy Research and Exercise System (MARES)

External scientific hardware:

- Columbus - External Payload Facility (Columbus-EPF)
- European Technology Exposure Facility (EuTEF)
- Sun Monitoring on the External Payload Facility of Columbus (SOLAR)

=== Destiny ===
- Fluids and Combustion Facility (FCF)
  - Combustion Integrated Rack (CIR)
  - Fluids Integrated Rack (FIR)
- ExPRESS Rack 1
- ExPRESS Rack 2A
- ExPRESS Rack 3A
- ExPRESS Rack 4
- ExPRESS Rack 5
- ExPRESS Rack 6
- ExPRESS Rack 7
- ExPRESS Rack 8
- Human Research Facility 1 (HRF-1)
- Human Research Facility 2 (HRF-2)
- Materials Science Research Rack-1 (MSRR-1)
- Minus Eighty-Degree Laboratory Freezer for ISS (MELFI)
- Window Observational Research Facility (WORF)

Planned for launch:

- Basic Express Rack 9B (ISS facility) | BER-9B ExPRESS Rack with only cooling and electrical power, eight Mid Deck Locker payloads. Launched on HTV-6
- Basic Express Rack 10B (ISS facility) | BER-10B
- Second Glove Box, MSG-2 or Live Science Glovebox LSG

=== Kibo ===
Internal scientific hardware:

- Ryutai Experiment Rack (Ryutai)
  - Fluid Physics Experiment Facility (FPEF)
  - Solution Crystallization Observation Facility (SCOF)
  - Protein Crystallization Research Facility (PCRF)
  - Image Processing Unit (IPU)
- Kobairo Rack :
  - Gradient Heating Furnace (GHF)
- Saibo Experiment Rack (Saibo)
  - Cell Biology Experiment Facility (CBEF)
  - Clean Bench (CB)
- Lab Support Equipments and other smaller instruments
  - The Minus Eighty Degree Celsius Laboratory Freezer for the International Space Station (MELFI)
  - Biological Experiment Unit (BEU)
  - High Definition TeleVision transmitting system (HDTV)
  - Passive Dosimeter for Life Science Experiments in Space (PADLES)
  - Human Research Facility Holter Monitor
  - Payload Laptop Terminal (PLT)
  - Microgravity Measurement Apparatus (MMA),
  - Utility DC/DC Converter Unit (UDC)

External scientific hardware:

- Japanese Experiment Module - Exposed Facility

=== Poisk ===
- Multipurpose workstation (MWS)

=== ISS small hardware ===
- Actiwatch (Actiwatch)
- BioServe Culture Apparatus (BCA)
- Biological Research in Canisters for OptiCells (BRIC-Opti)
- Human Research Facility Continuous Blood Pressure Device (CBPD)
- Hand Grip Dynamometer Pinch Force Dynamometer (HGD-PFD)
- Human Research Facility Holter Monitor (Holter)
- Kennedy Space Center Fixation Tube (KFT)
- Portable Clinical Blood Analyzer - i-STAT (PCBA)
- Radiation Area Monitor (RAM)
- Tissue Equivalent Proportional Counter (TEPC)
- Urine Monitoring System (UMS)
- Vegetable Production System (Veggie)

=== ISS sub-rack ===
- Advanced Biological Research System (ABRS)
- Advanced Protein Crystallization Facility (APCF)
- ARCTIC Refrigerator-Freezer (ARCTIC)
- Biotechnology Specimen Temperature Controller (BSTC)
- Biotechnology Temperature Refrigerator (BTR)
- Boiling Experiment Facility (BXF)
- Clean Bench (CB)
- Cell Biology Experiment Facility (CBEF)
- Commercial Generic Bioprocessing Apparatus (CGBA)
- Commercial Plant Biotechnology Facility (CPBF)
- Commercial Refrigerator Incubator Module - Modified (CRIM-M)
- European Modular Cultivation System (EMCS)
- Fluid Physics Experiment Facility (FPEF)
- Flywheel Exercise Device (FWED)
- Image Processing Unit (IPU)
- Mice Drawer System Facility (MDS_Facility)
- Microgravity Vibration Isolation Subsystem (MVIS)
- Portable Astroculture Chamber (PASC)
- Protein Crystal Growth - Single Locker Thermal Enclosure System (PCG-STES)
- Protein Crystallization Research Facility (PCRF)
- Pulmonary Function System (PFS)
- Portable Glovebox (PGB)
- Refrigerated Centrifuge (RC)
- Solution Crystallization Observation Facility (SCOF)
- Space Linear Acceleration Mass Measurement Device (SLAMMD)
- Human Research Facility Ultrasound on the International Space Station (Ultrasound)

=== ISS stowage ===
- Autonomous Biological System (ABS)
- Advanced Space Experiment Processor (ADSEP)
- Astro Garden
- Biological Research in Canisters (BRIC)
- Cell Culturing (CellCult)
- Group Activation Pack - Fluid Processing Apparatus (GAP-FPA)
- Granada Crystallization Facility (GCF)

=== ISS mid-deck locker ===
- Avian Development Facility (ADF)
- Animal Enclosure Module (AEM)
- General Laboratory Active Cryogenic ISS Experiment Refrigerator (GLACIER)
- Microgravity Experiment Research Locker Incubator (MERLIN)
- T-Cell Growth System (T-CGS)
- Polar (Research Refrigerator for ISS)

=== ISS mid-deck locker insert ===
- Biotube
- Kennedy Space Center Gaseous Nitrogen Freezer (GN2)

== JAXA's ISS research and science activity ==
=== Experiments ===
- Chaos, Turbulence and its Transition Process in Marangoni Convection Marangoni Exp (Fluid Physics Experiment Facility (FPEF) )
- Spatio-temporal Flow Structure in Marangoni Convection (Marangoni UVP/MaranGoniat) (Fluid Physics Experiment Facility (FPEF) )
- Experimental Assessment of Dynamic Surface Deformation Effects in Transition to Oscillatory Thermo capillary Flow in Liquid Bridge of High Prandtl Number Fluid (Fluid Physics Experiment Facility (FPEF) )
- Pattern Formation during Ice Crystal Growth (Ice Crystal) (Solution Crystallization Observation Facility (SCOF) )
- Investigation on Mechanism of Faceted Cellular Array Growth (Facet) (Solution Crystallization Observation Facility (SCOF) )
- Growth of Homogeneous SiGe Crystals in Microgravity by the TLZ Method (Hicari) (Gradient Heating Furnace (GHF) )
- Gene expression of p53-regulated Genes in Mammalian Cultured Cells after Exposure to Space Environment (Rad Gene)
- Detection of Changes in LOH Profile of TK mutants of Human Cultured Cells (LOH)
- Control of cell differentiation and morphogenesis of amphibian culture cells (Dome Gene)
- Integrated Assessment of Long-term Cosmic Radiation Through Biological Responses of the Silkworm, Bombyx mori, in Space (Rad Silk)
- RNA interference and protein phosphorylation in space environment using the nematode Caenorhabditis elegans (CERISE)
- Cbl-Mediated Protein Ubiquitination Downregulates the Response of Skeletal Muscle Cells to Growth Factors in Space (Myo Lab)
- Hydrotropism and Auxin-Inducible Gene Expression in Roots Grown under Microgravity Conditions (Hydro Tropi)
- Biological effects of space radiation and microgravity on mammalian cells (Neuro Rad)
- Life Cycle of Higher Plants under Microgravity Conditions (Space Seed)
- Regulation by Gravity of Ferulate Formation in Cell Walls of Rice Seedlings (Ferulate)

==== Applied research fields ====
- High Quality Protein Crystallization Research (HQPC)
- Applied research core center promotion program New material development (Protein Crystallization Research Facility (PCRF))
- Applied research core center promotion program Dynamics of Interfaces (Cell Biology Experiment Facility (CBEF))

==== Human space technology development fields ====
- Passive Dosimeter for Life Science Experiments in Space (PADLES)
- High Definition TeleVision transmitting system (HDTV)
- Varidation of On-orbit Digital Holter ECG Monitoring
- Bisphosphonates as a Countermeasure to Space Flight Induced Bone Loss

==== Educational and cultural utilization fields ====
- Space Poem Chain (ISS Experiment)
- Pilot missions for utilization for culture and humanity and social sciences

==== Commercial utilization fields ====
Fee-based utilization of Kibo is available to unrestricted research groups for commercial use. Costs involved in the operation will be paid by each user. The results obtained through the utilization will belong to the user.

==== Exposed facility experiments ====
- Monitor of All-sky X-ray Image (MAXI)
- Space Environment Data Acquisition Equipment - Attached Payload (SEDA-AP)
- Superconducting Submillimeter-Wave Limb Emission Sounder (SMILES)

== NASA's ISS research and science activity ==
=== Human research ===
==== Effect of prolonged space flight on human skeletal muscle ====
- Bisphosphonates as a Countermeasure to Space Flight Induced Bone Loss (Bisphosphonates)
- Commercial Biomedical Testing Module: Effects of Osteoprotegerin on Bone Maintenance in Microgravity (CBTM)
- Commercial Biomedical Test Module - 2 (CBTM-2)
- Foot Reaction Forces During Space Flight (Foot)
- Effects of Altered Gravity on Spinal Cord Excitability (H-Reflex)
- Hand Posture Analyzer (HPA)
- Renal Stone Risk During Spaceflight: Assessment and Countermeasure Validation (Renal_Stone)
- Spinal Elongation and its Effects on Seated Height in a Microgravity Environment (Spinal_Elongation)
- Subregional Assessment of Bone Loss in the Axial Skeleton in Long-term Space Flight (Subregional_Bone)

==== Cardiovascular and pulmonary systems ====
- Cardiovascular and Cerebrovascular Control on Return from ISS (CCISS)
- Cardiac Atrophy and Diastolic Dysfunction During and After Long Duration Spaceflight: Functional Consequences for Orthostatic Intolerance, Exercise Capability and Risk for Cardiac Arrhythmias (Integrated_Cardiovascular)
- Test of Midodrine as a Countermeasure Against Post-flight Orthostatic Hypotension - Long (Midodrine-Long)
- Test of Midodrine as a Countermeasure Against Post-flight Orthostatic Hypotension - Short Duration Biological Investigation (Midodrine-SDBI)
- The Effects of EVA and Long-Term Exposure to Microgravity on Pulmonary Function (PuFF)
- Evaluation of Maximal Oxygen Uptake and Submaximal Estimates of VO2max Before, During, and After Long Duration International Space Station Missions (VO2max)
- Effect of Microgravity on the Peripheral Subcutaneous Veno-Arteriolar Reflex in Humans (Xenon1)

==== Crew healthcare systems ====
- IntraVenous Fluid GENeration for Exploration Missions (IVGEN)
- Stability of Pharmacotherapeutic and Nutritional Compounds (Stability)

==== Human behaviour and performance ====
- Bodies In the Space Environment was an experiment run from 2009 to 2010 studying how people perceive relative direction in space.
- Crewmember and Crew-Ground Interaction During International Space Station Missions (Interactions)
- Behavioral Issues Associated with Isolation and Confinement: Review and Analysis of ISS Crew Journals (Journals)
- Sleep-Wake Actigraphy and Light Exposure During Spaceflight-Long (Sleep-Long)
- Sleep-Wake Actigraphy and Light Exposure During Spaceflight-Short (Sleep-Short)
- Human Factors Assessment of Vibration Effects on Visual Performance During Launch (Visual_Performance)

==== Immune system ====
- Differentiation of Bone Marrow Macrophages in Space (BONEMAC)
- Cell Culture Module - Immune Response of Human Monocytes in Microgravity (CCM-Immune_Response)
- Cell Culture Module - Effect of Microgravity on Wound Repair: In Vitro Model of New Blood Vessel Development (CCM-Wound_Repair)
- Space Flight Induced Reactivation of Latent Epstein-Barr Virus (Epstein-Barr)
- Validation of Procedures for Monitoring Crewmember Immune Function (Integrated_Immune)
- Incidence of Latent Virus Shedding During Space Flight (Latent_Virus)

==== Integrated physiology ====
- Advanced Diagnostic Ultrasound in Microgravity (ADUM)
- Nutritional Status Assessment (Nutrition)
- Dietary Intake Can Predict and Protect Against Changes in Bone Metabolism during Spaceflight and Recovery (Pro_K)
- National Aeronautics and Space Administration Biological Specimen Repository (Repository)

==== Neurological and vestibular systems ====
- ELaboratore Immagini TElevisive - Space 2 (ELITE-S2)
- Promoting Sensorimotor Response Generalizability: A Countermeasure to Mitigate Locomotor Dysfunction After Long-Duration Space Flight (Mobility)
- Bioavailability and Performance Effects of Promethazine During Space Flight (PMZ)

==== Radiation ====
- Anomalous Long Term Effects in Astronauts' Central Nervous System (ALTEA)
- Anomalous Long Term Effects in Astronauts' Central Nervous System - Shield (ALTEA-Shield)
- Bonner Ball Neutron Detector (BBND)
- Chromosomal Aberrations in Blood Lymphocytes of Astronauts (Chromosome)
- Dosimetric Mapping (DOSMAP)
- A Study of Radiation Doses Experienced by Astronauts in EVA (EVARM)
- Organ Dose Measurement Using the Phantom Torso (Torso)
- Mental Representation of Spatial Cues During Space Flight (3D-Space)

==== Other experiments ====
- Long Term Microgravity: A Model for Investigating Mechanisms of Heart Disease with New Portable Equipment (Card)
- Cytogenetic Effects of Ionizing Radiation in Peripheral Lymphocytes of ISS Crewmembers (Chromosome-2)
- Astronaut's Energy Requirements for Long-Term Space Flight (Energy)
- Neuroendocrine and Immune Responses in Humans During and After Long Term Stay at ISS (Immuno)
- Motion Perception: Vestibular Adaptation to G-Transitions (MOP)
- Study of Low Back Pain in Crewmembers During Space Flight (Mus)
- Otolith Assessment During Postflight Re-adaptation (Otolith)
- Perceptual Motor Deficits in Space (PMDIS)
- Psychomotor Vigilance Self Test on the International Space Station (Reaction_Self_Test)
- Study of Microbial Communities Exposed to Weightlessness (Sample)
- SOdium LOading in Microgravity (SOLO)
- Validation of Centrifugation as a Countermeasure for Otolith Deconditioning During Spaceflight (Spin)
- Test of Reaction and Adaptation Capabilities (TRAC)
- Ambiguous Tilt and Translation Motion Cues After Space Flight (Zag)

=== Biology and biotechnology ===
==== Animal biology ====
- Fungal Pathogenesis, Tumorigenesis, and Effects of Host Immunity in Space (FIT)
- Mice Drawer System (MDS)
- Rodent Research Hardware System

==== Cellular biology and biotechnology ====
- Avian Development Facility - Development and Function of the Avian Otolith System in Normal Altered Gravity Environments (ADF-Otolith)
- Avian Development Facility - Skeletal Development in embryonic Quail (ADF-Skeletal)
- Cellular Biotechnology Operations Support Systems: Human Renal Cortical Cell Differentiation and Hormone Production (CBOSS-01-02-Renal)
- Cellular Biotechnology Operations Support Systems: Use of NASA Bioreactor to Study Cell Cycle Regulation: Mechanisms of Colon Carcinoma Metastasis in Microgravity (CBOSS-01-Colon)
- Cellular Biotechnology Operations Support Systems: Evaluation of Ovarian Tumor Cell Growth and Gene Expression (CBOSS-01-Ovarian)
- Cellular Biotechnology Operations Support Systems: PC12 Pheochromocytoma Cells - A Proven Model System for Optimizing 3-D Cell Culture Biotechnology in Space (CBOSS-01-PC12)
- Cellular Biotechnology Operations Support Systems: Production of Recombinant Human Erythropoietin by Mammalian Cells (CBOSS-02-Erythropoietin)
- Cellular Biotechnology Operations Support Systems: The Effect of Microgravity on the Immune Function of Human Lymphoid Tissue (CBOSS-02-HLT)
- Cellular Biotechnology Operations Support Systems: Fluid Dynamics Investigation (CBOSS-FDI)
- Commercial Generic Bioprocessing Apparatus - Antibiotic Production in Space (CGBA-APS)
- Commercial Generic Bioprocessing Apparatus - Kidney Cell Gene Expression (CGBA-KCGE)
- Commercial Generic Bioprocessing Apparatus - Synaptogenesis in Microgravity (CGBA-SM)
- Microencapsulation Electrostatic Processing System (MEPS)
- StelSys Liver Cell Function Research (StelSys)
- Gene, Immune and Cellular Responses to Single and Combined Space Flight Conditions - A (TripleLux-A)
- Gene, Immune and Cellular Responses to Single and Combined Space Flight Conditions - B (TripleLux-B)

==== Microbiology ====
In August 2020, scientists reported that bacteria from Earth, particularly Deinococcus radiodurans bacteria, which is highly resistant to environmental hazards, were found to survive for three years in outer space, based on studies conducted on the International Space Station. These findings support the notion of panspermia, the hypothesis that life exists throughout the Universe, distributed in various ways, including space dust, meteoroids, asteroids, comets, planetoids or contaminated spacecraft.

- Microbial Drug Resistance Virulence (MDRV)
- Effect of Spaceflight on Microbial Gene Expression and Virulence (Microbe)
- National Laboratory Pathfinder - Cells (NLP-Cells)
- National Laboratory Pathfinder - Vaccine - 1A (NLP-Vaccine-1A)
- National Laboratory Pathfinder - Vaccine - 1B (NLP-Vaccine-1B)
- National Lab Pathfinder - Vaccine - 1C (NLP-Vaccine-1C)
- National Lab Pathfinder - Vaccine - 2 (NLP-Vaccine-2)
- National Lab Pathfinder - Vaccine - 3 (NLP-Vaccine-3)
- National Lab Pathfinder - Vaccine - 4 (NLP-Vaccine-4)
- National Lab Pathfinder - Vaccine - 5 (NLP-Vaccine-5)
- Passive Observatories for Experimental Microbial Systems (POEMS)
- Streptococcus pneumoniae Expression of Genes in Space (SPEGIS)
- Surface, Water and Air Biocharacterization - A Comprehensive Characterization of Microorganisms and Allergens in Spacecraft Environment (SWAB)
- Yeast-Group Activation Packs (Yeast-GAP)

==== Plant biology ====
- Advanced AstrocultureTM (ADVASC)
- Biomass Production System (BPS)
- Cambium (Cambium)
- Cell Wall/Reverse Genetic Approach to Exploring Genes Responsible for Cell Wall Dynamics in Supporting Tissues of Arabidopsis Under Microgravity Conditions and Resist Wall/Role of Microtubule-Membrane-Cell Wall Continuum in Gravity Resistance in Plants (CWRW)
- Gravity Related Genes in Arabidopsis - A (Genara-A)
- Threshold Acceleration for Gravisensing (Gravi)
- Threshold Acceleration for Gravisensing - 2 (Gravi-2)
- Validating Vegetable Production Unit (VPU) Plants, Protocols, Procedures and Requirements (P3R) Using Currently Existing Flight Resources (Lada-VPU-P3R)
- Molecular and Plant Physiological Analyses of the Microgravity Effects on Multigeneration Studies of Arabidopsis thaliana (Multigen)
- National Laboratory Pathfinder - Cells - 3: Jatropha Biofuels (NLP-Cells-3)
- The Optimization of Root Zone Substrates (ORZS) for Reduced Gravity Experiments Program (ORZS)
- Photosynthesis Experiment and System Testing and Operation (PESTO)
- Plant Generic Bioprocessing Apparatus (PGBA)
- Transgenic Arabidopsis Gene Expression System (TAGES)
- Analysis of a Novel Sensory Mechanism in Root Phototropism (Tropi)

==== Protein crystallization ====
- Advanced Protein Crystallization Facility - Extraordinary Structural Features of Antibodies from Camelids (APCF-Camelids)
- Advanced Protein Crystallization Facility - Solution Flows and Molecular Disorder of Protein Crystals: Growth of High Quality Crystals, Motions of Lumazin Crystals and Growth of Ferritin Crystals (APCF-Crystal_Growth)
- Advanced Protein Crystallization Facility - Effect of Different Growth Conditions on the Quality of Thaumatin and Aspartyl-tRNA Synthetase Crystals Grown in Microgravity (APCF-Crystal_Quality)
- Advanced Protein Crystallization Facility - Crystallization of Human Low Density Lipoprotein (LDL) Subfractions in Microgravity (APCF-Lipoprotein)
- Advanced Protein Crystallization Facility - Testing New Trends in Microgravity Protein Crystallization (APCF-Lysozyme)
- Advanced Protein Crystallization Facility - Crystallization of the Next Generation of Octarellins (APCF-Octarellins)
- Advanced Protein Crystallization Facility - Protein Crystallization in Microgravity, Collagen Model (X-Y-Gly) Polypeptides - the case of (Pro-Pro-Gly) 10 (APCF-PPG10)
- Advanced Protein Crystallization Facility - Crystallization of Rhodopsin in Microgravity (APCF-Rhodopsin)
- Commercial Protein Crystal Growth - High Density (CPCG-H)
- Dynamically Controlled Protein Crystal Growth (DCPCG)
- Protein Crystal Growth-Enhanced Gaseous Nitrogen Dewar (PCG-EGN)
- Protein Crystal Growth-Single Locker Thermal Enclosure System-Improved Diffraction Quality of Crystals (PCG-STES-IDQC)
- Protein Crystal Growth-Single Locker Thermal Enclosure System-Crystallization of the Integral Membrane Protein Using Microgravity (PCG-STES-IMP)
- Protein Crystal Growth-Single Locker Thermal Enclosure System-Synchrotron Based Mosaicity Measurements of Crystal Quality and Theoretical Modeling (PCG-STES-MM)
- Protein Crystal Growth-Single Locker Thermal Enclosure System-Crystallization of the Mitochondrial Metabolite Transport Proteins (PCG-STES-MMTP)
- Protein Crystal Growth-Single Locker Thermal Enclosure System - Crystal Growth Model System for Material Science (PCG-STES-MS)
- Protein Crystal Growth-Single Locker Thermal Enclosure System-Engineering a Ribozyme for Diffraction Properties (PCG-STES-RDP)
- Protein Crystal Growth-Single Locker Thermal Enclosure System-Regulation of Gene Expression (PCG-STES-RGE)
- Protein Crystal Growth-Single Locker Thermal Enclosure System-Science and Applications of Facility Hardware for Protein Crystal Growth (PCG-STES-SA)
- Protein Crystal Growth-Single Locker Thermal Enclosure System-Vapor Equilibrium Kinetics Studies (PCG-STES-VEKS)

==== Other experiments ====
- Dome Gene Experiment (DomeGene)
- Exposure Experiment (Expose)
- Fischer Rat Thyroid Low Serum 5% (FRTL5)
- High Quality Protein Crystallization (HQPC)
- Detection of Changes in LOH Profile of TK mutants of Human Cultured Cells (LOH) - Gene Expression of p53-Regulated Genes in Mammalian Cultured Cells After Exposure to Space Environment (LOH-RadGene)
- Effects of Microgravity on the Haemopoietic System: A Study on Neocytolysis (Neocytolysis)
- PAthway DIfferent ACtivators (PADIAC)
- ROle of Apoptosis in Lymphocyte Depression (ROALD)
- Study of Space Environment Effects on PY17 Bacterial Spores on board Space Shuttle (Spore)
- Waving and Coiling of Arabidopsis Roots at Different g-levels (WAICO)

=== Physical and materials sciences ===
==== Combustion science ====
- Flame Extinguishment Experiment (FLEX)
- Smoke Point In Co-flow Experiment (SPICE)

==== Fluid physics ====
- Capillary Flow Experiment (CFE)
- DEvice for the study of Critical LIquids and Crystallization - High Temperature Insert (DECLIC-HTI)
- Fluid Merging Viscosity Measurement (FMVM)
- Miscible Fluids in Microgravity (MFMG)
- Shear History Extensional Rheology Experiment (SHERE)
- Selectable Optical Diagnostics Instrument-Influence of VIbrations on DIffusion of Liquids (SODI-IVIDIL)

==== Materials science ====
- Binary Colloidal Alloy Test - 3 and 4: Critical Point (BCAT-3-4-CP)
- Binary Colloidal Alloy Test - 3: Binary Alloys (BCAT-3-BA)
- Binary Colloidal Alloy Test - 3: Surface Crystallization (BCAT-3-SC)
- Binodal Colloidal Aggregation Test - 4: Polydispersion (BCAT-4-Poly)
- Binary Colloidal Alloy Test - 5: Three-Dimensional Melt (BCAT-5-3D-Melt)
- Binary Colloidal Alloy Test - 5: Compete (BCAT-5-Compete)
- Binary Colloidal Alloy Test-5: Phase Separation (BCAT-5-PhaseSep)
- Coarsening in Solid Liquid Mixtures-2 (CSLM-2)
- DEvice for the study of Critical LIquids and Crystallization - Directional Solidification Insert (DECLIC-DSI)
- EXPRESS Physics of Colloids in Space (EXPPCS)
- Viscous Liquid Foam - Bulk Metallic Glass (Foam)
- Investigating the Structure of Paramagnetic Aggregates from Colloidal Emulsions (InSPACE)
- Investigating the Structure of Paramagnetic Aggregates from Colloidal Emulsions - 2 (InSPACE-2)
- Materials International Space Station Experiment (MISSE 1, 2, 3, 4, 5, 6A, 6B, 7, and 8)
- Materials Science Laboratory - Columnar-to-Equiaxed Transition in Solidification Processing and Microstructure Formation in Casting of Technical Alloys under Diffusive and Magnetically Controlled Convective Conditions (MSL-CETSOL_and_MICAST)
- Toward Understanding Pore Formation and Mobility During Controlled Directional Solidification in a Microgravity Environment (PFMI)
- Selectable Optical Diagnostics Instrument - Aggregation of Colloidal Solutions (SODI-Colloid) (ISS Experiment)
- Space-Dynamically Responding Ultrasonic Matrix System (SpaceDRUMS)
- Solidification Using a Baffle in Sealed Ampoules (SUBSA)
- Zeolite Crystal Growth (ZCG)

==== Quantum Physics ====
- Cold Atom Laboratory

==== Other experiments ====
- Fundamental and Applied Studies of Emulsion Stability (FASES)
- Simulation of Geophysical Fluid Flow Under Microgravity (Geoflow)
- Chaos, Turbulence and its Transition Process in Marangoni Convection (Marangoni)

=== Technology development ===
==== Characterizing the microgravity environment on ISS ====
- Active Rack Isolation System - ISS Characterization Experiment (ARIS-ICE)
- Microgravity Acceleration Measurement System (MAMS)
- Space Acceleration Measurement System-II (SAMS-II)

==== Environmental monitoring of ISS ====
- Analyzing Interferometer for Ambient Air (ANITA)
- JPL Electronic Nose (ENose)
- Lab-on-a-Chip Application Development-Portable Test System (LOCAD-PTS)
- Lab-on-a-Chip Application Development-Portable Test System - Exploration (LOCAD-PTS-Exploration)
- Vehicle Cabin Atmosphere Monitor (VCAM)

==== Picosatellites and control technologies ====
- Avatar Explore: Autonomous Robotic Operations Performed from the ISS (Avatar_Explore)
- Dual RF Astrodynamic GPS Orbital Navigator Satellite (DRAGONSat)
- Middeck Active Control Experiment-II (MACE-II)
- Synchronized Position Hold, Engage, Reorient, Experimental Satellites (SPHERES)
- Space Test Program-H2-Microelectromechanical System-Based (MEMS) PICOSAT Inspector (STP-H2-MEPSI)
- Space Test Program-H2-Radar Fence Transponder (STP-H2-RAFT)

==== Spacecraft materials ====
- Elastic Memory Composite Hinge (EMCH)
- In Space Soldering Investigation (ISSI)
- Pico-Satellite Solar Cell Experiment (PSSC)
- Rigidizable Inflatable Get-Away-Special Experiment (RIGEX)

==== Spacecraft systems ====
- Boiling eXperiment Facility - Microheater Array Boiling Experiment (BXF-MABE)
- Boiling eXperiment Facility - Nucleate Pool Boiling eXperiment (BXF-NPBX)
- Dust and Aerosol Measurement Feasibility Test (DAFT)
- Delay Tolerant Networking (DTN)
- Maui Analysis of Upper Atmospheric Injections (MAUI)
- Multi-User Droplet Combustion Apparatus - Flame Extinguishment Experiment (MDCA-FLEX)
- Smoke and Aerosol Measurement Experiment (SAME)
- Space Communications and Navigation Testbed (SCAN_Testbed)
- Shuttle Exhaust Ion Turbulence Experiments (SEITE)
- Shuttle Ionospheric Modification with Pulsed Localized Exhaust Experiments (SIMPLEX)
- Serial Network Flow Monitor (SNFM)

==== Spacecraft and orbital environments ====
- Atmospheric Neutral Density Experiment - 2 (ANDE-2)
- Ram Burn Observations (RAMBO)
- Space Test Program-H2-Atmospheric Neutral Density Experiment (STP-H2-ANDE)

==== Other experiments ====
- DEBris In Orbit Evaluator - 2 (DEBIE-2)
- EuTEF Thermometer (EuTemp)
- Earth Viewing Camera (EVC)
- Activation and Test Downlink of HDTV System (JAXA-HDTV)
- Particle Flux Demonstrator (Particle_Flux)
- Tribology Laboratory (TriboLab)

=== Earth and space science ===
==== Earth science ====
- Agricultural Camera (AgCam)
- Crew Earth Observations (CEO)
- Crew Earth Observations - International Polar Year (CEO-IPY)
- ISS-RapidScat

==== Space science ====
- Alpha Magnetic Spectrometer - 02 (AMS-02)
- Neutron Star Interior Composition Explorer (NICER)

==== Other monitors and observatories from the field ====
- DOSimetry TELescopes (DOSTEL)
- Flux (Phi) Probe EXperiment - Time resolved Measurement of Atomic Oxygen (FIPEX)
- HICO and RAIDS Experiment Payload - Hyperspectral Imager for the Coastal Ocean (HREP-HICO)
- HICO and RAIDS Experiment Payload - Remote Atmospheric and Ionospheric Detection System (RAIDS) (HREP-RAIDS)
- RaDI-N (RaDI-N)

=== ISS operations results ===
==== Crew-initiated science ====
- Science of Opportunity (Saturday_Morning_Science)

==== Educational activities ====
- Amateur Radio on the International Space Station (ARISS)
- Education - How Solar Cells Work (Education-Solar_Cells)
- International Space Station Inflight Education Downlinks (Inflight_Education_Downlinks)

==== Environmental monitoring of ISS ====
- Anomalous Long Term Effects in Astronauts' - Dosimetry (ALTEA-Dosi)
- International Space Station Acoustic Measurement Program (ISS_Acoustics)

==== Medical monitoring of ISS crew members ====
- Clinical Nutrition Assessment of ISS Astronauts, SMO-016E (Clinical_Nutrition_Assessment)

==== Spacecraft systems ====
- International Space Station Zero-Propellant Maneuver (ZPM) Demonstration (ZPM)

==== Spacecraft and orbital environments ====
- Analysis of International Space Station Plasma Interaction (Plasma_Interaction_Model)

==== Station development test objective ====
- Validation of On-Orbit Methodology for the Assessment of Cardiac Function and Changes in the Circulating Volume Using Ultrasound and Braslet-M Occlusion Cuffs, SDTO 17011 U/R (Braslet)
- Component Repair Experiment - 1, SDTO 17012U (CRE-1)
- Soldering in Reduced Gravity Experiment, SDTO 17003-U (SoRGE)
- Solid State Lighting Module, SDTO 15008U (SSLM)

==== Supplementary Medical Objective ====
- Periodic Fitness Evaluation with Oxygen Uptake Measurement (PFE-OUM)

== ESA and CSA reported ISS research and science activity ==
Much like NASA and JAXA, ESA and CSA also conducted numerous experiments on the International Space Station.

== Energia RSC reported ISS research and science activity ==
=== Human life research ===
- Sprut-MBI (ISS Experiment)
- Parodont (ISS Experiment)
- Cardio-ODNT (ISS Experiment)
- Mass Transfer (ISS Experiment)
- Prognos (ISS Experiment)
- Brados (ISS Experiment)
- Farma (ISS Experiment)
- Poligen (ISS Experiment)
- Diurez (ISS Experiment)
- Biotest (ISS Experiment)
- Biotest-1 (ISS Experiment)
- Profilaktika (ISS Experiment)
- Pulse (ISS Experiment)
- BIMS (ISS Experiment)
- Biorisk (ISS Experiment)
- Rastenia-2 (ISS Experiment)
- Pilot (ISS Experiment)
- Intercellular Interaction (ISS Experiment)
- Gematologia (ISS Experiment)
- Plasmida (ISS Experiment)
- Statokonia (ISS Experiment)
- Regeneratsia (ISS Experiment)
- Akvarium (ISS Experiment)
- Sonokard (ISS Experiment)
- Vzaimodeystviye (ISS Experiment)
- Dykhanie (ISS Experiment)
- Pneumocard (ISS Experiment)
- Rastenia (ISS Experiment)
- Tipologia (ISS Experiment)

=== Geophysical research ===
- Uragan (ISS Experiment)
- Relaksatsia (ISS Experiment)
- Molnyia-SM (ISS Experiment)
- Vsplesk (ISS Experiment)
- Impuls (ISS Experiment)
- Plazma-Progress (ISS Experiment)
- Plazma-MKS (ISS Experiment)
- Ten'-Mayak (ISS Experiment)

=== Earth resources sensing ===
- Diatomeya (ISS Experiment)
- Volny (ISS Experiment)
- Rusalka (ISS Experiment)
- Seiner (ISS Experiment)
- Ekon (ISS Experiment)

=== Space biotechnology ===
- CPCF-2 (ISS Experiment)
- Mimetik-K (ISS Experiment)
- Biodegradation (ISS Experiment)
- Conjugation (ISS Experiment)
- MSK (ISS Experiment)
- KAF (ISS Experiment)
- Vaktsina-K (ISS Experiment)
- Bioekologia (ISS Experiment)
- Interleukin-K (ISS Experiment)
- Bioemulsia (ISS Experiment)
- Glikoproteid (ISS Experiment)
- Biotrek (ISS Experiment)
- Antigen (ISS Experiment)
- Lactolen (ISS Experiment)
- ARIL (ISS Experiment)
- OChB (ISS Experiment)
- Astrovaktsina (ISS Experiment)
- Zhenshen-2 (ISS Experiment)
- Kaskad (ISS Experiment)
- BIF (ISS Experiment)
- Bakteriofag (ISS Experiment)
- Structura (ISS Experiment)
- Konstanta (ISS Experiment)

=== Technical research ===
- Tenzor (ISS Experiment)
- Iskazhenye (ISS Experiment)
- Privyazka (ISS Experiment)
- Identificatsia (ISS Experiment)
- Izgib (ISS Experiment)
- Infrazvuk-M (ISS Experiment)
- Meteoroid (ISS Experiment)
- Vektor-T (ISS Experiment)
- Scorpion (ISS Experiment)
- Kromka (ISS Experiment)
- Acoustika-M (ISS Experiment)
- Toksichnost (ISS Experiment)
- Radioskaf (ISS Experiment)
- Sreda-MKS (ISS Experiment)
- Infotekh (ISS Experiment)
- Kontur (ISS Experiment)
- Veterok (ISS Experiment)
- BAR (ISS Experiment)
- Expert (ISS Experiment)
- Cold Atom Laboratory

=== Contract activities ===
- GTS (ISS Experiment)
- GTS-2 (ISS Experiment)
- Vzglyad (ISS Experiment)
- Biosfera (ISS Experiment)
- LEGO (ISS Experiment)
- Popular Mechanics (ISS Experiment)
- MPAC & SEED (ISS Experiment)
- HDTV (ISS Experiment)
- Starmail (ISS Experiment)
- GCF-JAXA (ISS Experiment)
- ROKVISS (ISS Experiment)
- Neurocog (ISS Experiment)
- Cardiocog (ISS Experiment)
- Neurocog-3 (ISS Experiment)
- 3DPC (ISS Experiment)
- 3DPC-2 (ISS Experiment)
- SCN (ISS Experiment)
- Cardiocog-4 (ISS Experiment)
- NOA (ISS Experiment)
- IMMUNO (ISS Experiment)
- Golf (ISS Experiment)
- Myocite (ISS Experiment)
- Stroma (ISS Experiment)
- Amphybody (ISS Experiment)
- Tubul (ISS Experiment)
- MIA (ISS Experiment)
- NKA (ISS Experiment)
- Bioculture (ISS Experiment)
- Altcriss (ISS Experiment)
- Cult (ISS Experiment)
- Sample-LDM (ISS Experiment)
- AT-SPACE (ISS Experiment)
- BIOKIN 4 (ISS Experiment)
- PKINASE (ISS Experiment)
- EXPOSE-R (ISS Experiment)
- Pille-Simonyi-2 (ISS Experiment)
- Sample (ISS Experiment)

=== Study of cosmic rays ===
- Platan (ISS Experiment)
- BTN-Neutron (ISS Experiment)
- Matryoshka-R (ISS Experiment)

=== Educational and humanitarian projects ===
- Kolibry Project (ISS Experiment)
- Konstructor Project (ISS Experiment)
- MATI-75 (ISS Experiment)
- MAI-75 (ISS Experiment)
- Fizika-Obrazovanie (ISS Experiment)

=== Space technology and material science ===
- SVS (ISS Experiment)
- Kristallizator (ISS Experiment)
- PKE Nefedov plasma crystal experiment (joint Russian-German experiment, 1998 - 2004)
- PK-3 Plus plasma crystal experiment (joint Russian-German experiment)

== Other ==
In May 2011, Space Shuttle Endeavour mission STS-134 carried 13 Lego kits to the ISS, where astronauts built models and saw how they reacted in microgravity, as part of the Lego Bricks in Space program. The results were shared with schools as part of an educational project.

- Planned:
- OPALS
