= MAXI J1659-152 =

Rapidly rotating x-ray binary system

Observation data Epoch J2000 Equinox ICRS
- Constellation: Ophiuchus
- Right ascension: 16^{h} 59^{m} 01.680^{s}
- Declination: −15° 15′ 28.73″
- Apparent magnitude (V): 26.2 − 27.5

Characteristics
- Evolutionary stage: Black hole + red dwarf
- Spectral type: M2V

Orbit
Period (P)	2.414 ± 0.005 h

Other designations
- GRB 100925A, SWIFT J1659.2-1515

Database references
SIMBAD	data

A visual depiction of the system's fast orbit.

MAXI J1659-152 is a rapidly rotating black hole/star system, discovered by NASA's Swift space telescope on September 25, 2010. On March 19, 2013, ESA's XMM-Newton space telescope helped to identify a star and a black hole that orbit each other at the rate of once every 2.4 hours.

The black hole and the star orbit their common center of mass. Because the star is the lighter object, it lies farther from this point and has to "travel around its larger orbit at a breakneck speed of two million kilometers per hour", 500 to 600 km/s, or about 20 times Earth's orbital velocity. The star was the fastest moving star ever seen in an X-ray binary system until the discovery of system 47 Tuc X9. On the other hand, the black hole orbits at 'only' 150000 km/h.

The black hole in this compact pairing is at least three times more massive than the Sun, while its red dwarf companion star has a mass only 20% that of the Sun. The pair is separated by roughly a million kilometers – for comparison the distance to the Sun from Earth is about 150 million kilometers.

== See also ==
- MAXI
- S4716
