= MAXI =

X-ray telescope mounted on the International Space Station

The Monitor of All-sky X-ray Image (MAXI) is an X-ray telescope mounted on the International Space Station since 2009. The instrument uses wide field of view X-ray detectors to perform a sky survey, measuring the brightness of X-ray sources every 92 minutes (one ISS orbit).

== Instrument ==
MAXI was developed by the Japan Aerospace Exploration Agency (JAXA). It was launched in 2009 and mounted on the outside of the Kibō module.

The instrument uses several wide field of view X-ray detectors, including the Gas Slit Camera (GSC) and the Solid-state Slit Camera (SSC), to monitor astronomical X-ray sources for variability. MAXI conducts a full sky survey every 92 minutes (one ISS orbit).

In August 2022 a fast X-ray follow-up observation program was started with the NICER instrument named "OHMAN (On-orbit Hookup of MAXI and NICER)" to detect sudden bursts in X-ray phenomena.

== Discoveries ==
MAXI operations commenced in August 2009 with an original two-year operation plan. JAXA has extended mission duration multiple times with the latest extension to March 2021.

MAXI helped discover the rapidly rotating black-hole/star system MAXI J1659-152.

== Successor ==
iSEEP Wide-Field MAXI (iWF-MAXI) is a follow-on instrument to the current MAXI. Compared with MAXI, which can only monitor 2% of the celestial sphere instantaneously, iWF-MAXI is always capable of monitoring 10%, and can monitor up to 80% in 92 minutes. iWF-MAXI will utilize the i-SEEP (IVA-replaceable Small Exposed Experiment Platform) bus, an exposure adapter for middle-sized payloads in JEM-EF. Chosen as an ISAS Mission of Opportunity in 2015, iWF-MAXI has started observation at the ISS in 2019.

== See also ==
- Scientific research on the ISS
