= TROPI =

Scientific Experiment on the International Space Station

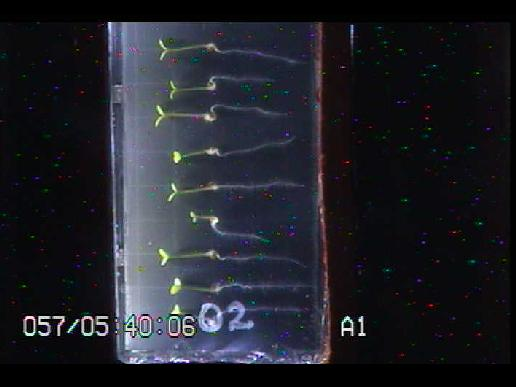
Vigorous growth of seedlings during TROPI on Expedition 22. In this phase of the experiment, plants were oriented since they grew in 1-g from an on-board centrifuge.

TROPI, or "Analysis of a Novel Sensory Mechanism in Root Phototropism", is an experiment on the International Space Station (ISS) to investigate the growth and development of plant seedlings under various gravity and lighting combinations. It was launched on Space Shuttle Endeavour during the STS-130 mission and was performed on the ISS during Expedition 22. Frozen plant samples from the TROPI experiment were returned on the landing of the STS-131 mission on Space Shuttle Discovery.

Arabidopsis thaliana seeds (thale cress, the genome of which has been DNA-sequenced as a reference organism for the study of plant biology and genetics), were germinated and grown under various lighting and gravity conditions, using centrifugal gravity simulation and LEDs of various wavelengths (colors) and intensities to model lighting conditions. The specific aim of this project was to investigate phototropism in plants grown in microgravity conditions without the complications of a 1-g environment. Experiments performed were used to explore the mechanisms of both blue-light- and red-light-induced phototropism in plants.

John Z. Kiss of Miami University (Oxford, Ohio) is the principal investigator; Richard E. Edelmann of Miami University and Melanie J. Correll of the University of Florida are co-investigators; Kenny Vassigh of NASA is the project manager and Marianne Steele of NASA is the project scientist. The payload was developed by the NASA Ames Research Center, Moffett Field, California. The experiment was performed in the European Modular Cultivation System (EMCS) built by the European Space Agency (ESA). The Norwegian User Support Operation Centre (N-USOC), located in Trondheim, Norway, controlled the EMCS during the TROPI experiments on the ISS.

In the long term, the results from TROPI will help in the development of future space, Moon, and Mars life-support systems, in which plants are used to help remove carbon dioxide and generate oxygen via photosynthesis for maintenance of atmospheric and other conditions, reducing the need for very expensive re-supply from Earth.

== See also ==
Scientific research on the ISS
