= Muscle Atrophy Research and Exercise System =

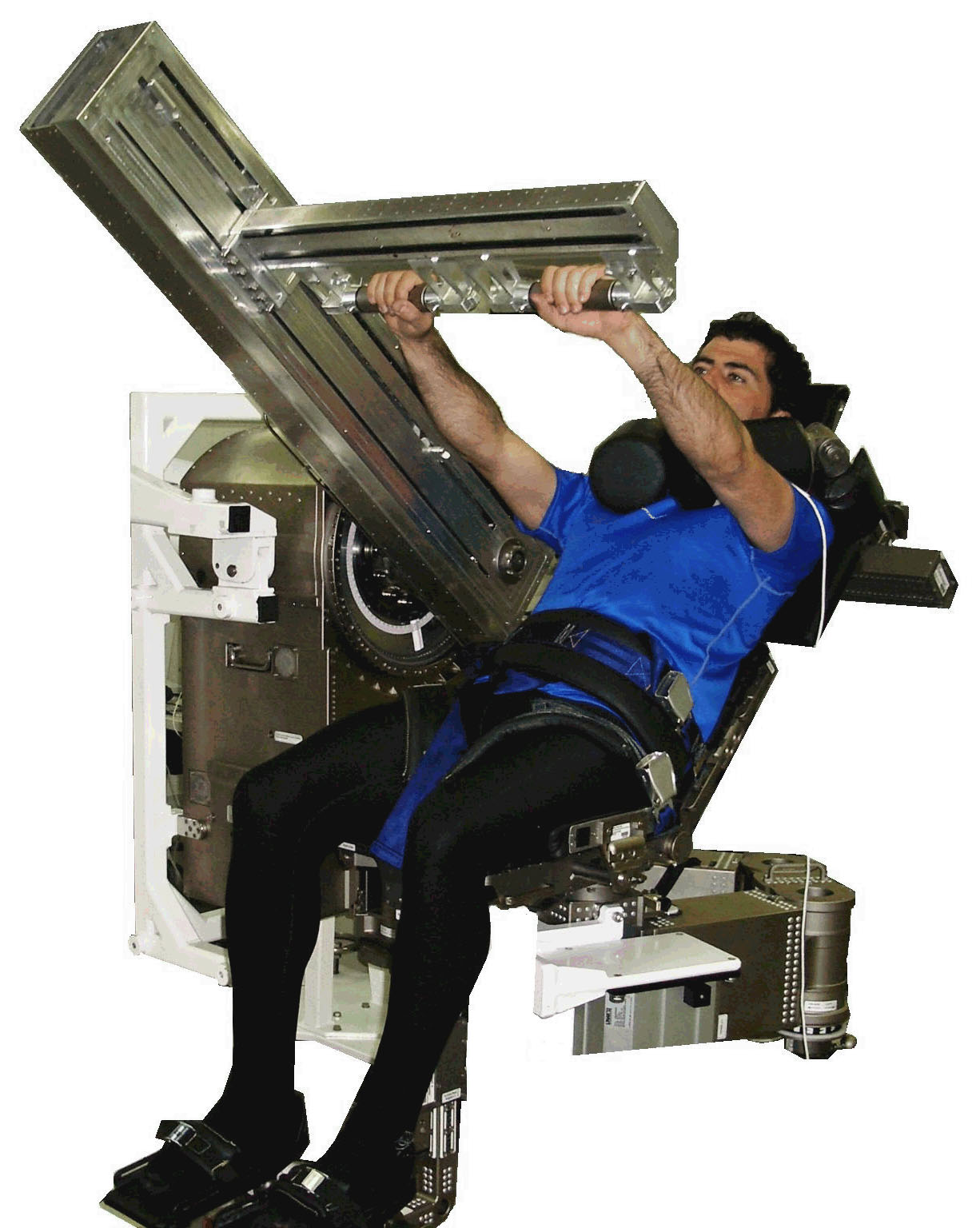
Test subject seated in the MARES human restraint system and using the linear adapter to exercise his arms.

The Muscle Atrophy Research and Exercise System (MARES), part of the Human Research Facility (HRF), was launched on 5 April 2010 (STS-131) in a stowed position inside the HRF MARES Rack, integrated into a Multi-Purpose Logistics Module (MPLM) and transported to the International Space Station. When deployed, MARES was attached to the seat tracks of an International Standard Payload Rack (ISPR) located in the Columbus Laboratory.

MARES provides a flexible, high-precision tooling system for analyzing the musculoskeletal system in microgravity environments. The platform serves two critical pillars of space exploration -

- Scientific Research: Empowering the space research and human physiology communities with deep physiological insights.

- Medical Operations (MEDOPS): Assisting officers responsible for safeguarding crew health during long-duration space missions.

By delivering quantifiable stimuli to diverse spaceflight participants, MARES accurately measures and evaluates crew muscle performance to counter the effects of muscle atrophy.

== Components ==
The hardware can be divided into five main components.

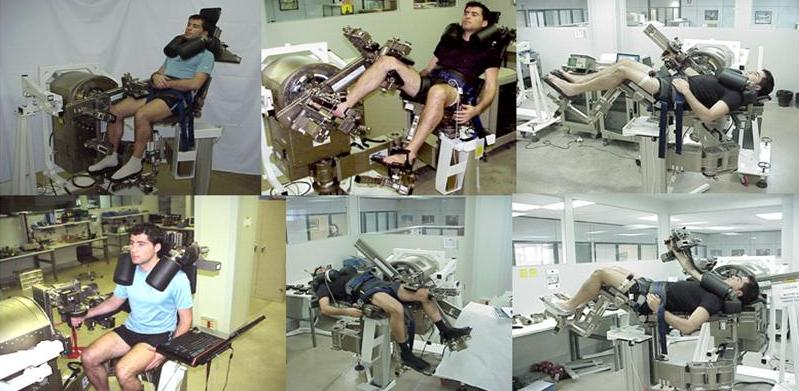
Collage of MARES hardware being tested on the ground with the test subject in various configurations.

=== Main electro-mechanical box ===
The main electro-mechanical box contains the powerful MARES direct drive motor which provides the core mechanical stimulus of the facility. The motor is capable of producing torques in the range of 3 Nm to 900 Nm. To give some examples of common torque values from "everyday life", a Black and Decker Cordless drill has about 12 Nm of torque, a 20 cm wrench with 120 N of force applied gives 24 Nm of torque and a 2002 Ford Focus ZTS running at 4500 RPM has 183 Nm of torque.

This MARES direct drive motor is capable of producing rotation at angular velocities between 5 degrees/sec and 515 degrees/s, or 343 degrees/s for eccentric motion. The main box also contains power, control, supervision, and servo drive electronics, cooling fans, and a connector panel used to connect the HRF workstation and other external devices to MARES, such as PEMS II.

The MARES motor may need up to 8 kW to accelerate but only for some tens of milliseconds. To minimize peak external power usage, MARES employs a battery, housed in the main box, which distributes these short power spikes over longer time periods. Using the battery as a buffer, MARES will consume an average of 150-200 W during a typical experimental session.

=== Human restraint system ===
The human restraint system includes the fully adjustable chair that the crew-member sits on, as well as a set of adjustable levers, connectors, pads, restraints, and hand-grips designed by biomechanics experts to support the nine joint configurations with subjects ranging from 5 to 95 percentile in size. The restraint system aims to isolate muscle groups under study and maintain the alignment of the joint and motor axes, while maintaining an acceptable subject comfort. The restraint system also includes a pantograph, which is capable of translating and rotating the chair into a wide range of positions relative to the main box.

=== Linear adapter ===
The linear adapter is used to convert the motor rotation into linear movements. It can be used for exercising one or both arms or legs at any inclination and includes force and torque sensors at the hand-grips.

=== Vibration isolation ===
The vibration isolation frame is used to keep facility forces internal to MARES by mechanically isolating MARES from the ISPR seat track and the ISS.

=== Laptop ===
The laptop allows for the crew-member to control and monitor MARES operations, including set-up procedures, experiment steps, data display, data processing, results summaries, and programming of a desired experiment/exercise scenario.

The MARES software is designed to clearly guide the subject/operator through all steps with tailored instructions, including text, graphics, and interaction prompts. It is fully programmable, allowing the user to set up complex movements by selecting from a pre-defined set of basic control algorithms for the motor, known as basic motion units (BMUs), and building up a sequence of exercise steps or routines.

There is a BMU for each mode of muscle contraction, including: isometric (muscle contraction at a fixed length, i.e. no movement), isotonic concentric (muscle shortens as it contracts at a constant torque), isokinetic concentric (muscle shortens as it contracts but at a constant velocity), isotonic and isokinetic eccentric (muscle extended). In addition, there are eleven more BMUs used to support more sophisticated experimental setups, including: spring, friction, additional moment of inertia or mass, pseudo-gravitational, position control, velocity control, torque/force control, power control, physical elements, extended torque or force control and quick release.

BMUs can be combined into distinct MARES profiles to create complex motions and to simulate common exercise routines used on Earth. These profiles can be developed on the ground by collaborating scientists and medical operations officers and uplinked to the MARES.

== See also ==
- Scientific research on the ISS
- ESA - MARES
