= Human Research Facility 1 =

Laboratory on the International Space Station

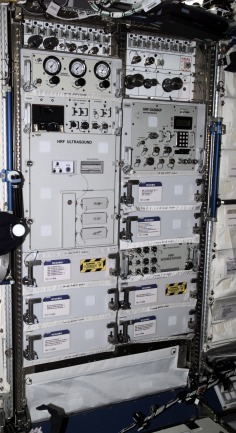
Human Research Facility 1 shown after its installation in the U.S. Laboratory, Destiny, during Expedition 2. - NASA Image: ISS02E6028

Human Research Facility 1 (HRF-1) on board the International Space Station (ISS) allows investigators to study the effects of long-duration space flight on the human body. Equipment in the HRF-1 includes a clinical ultrasound and a device for measuring mass.

== Summary ==
- Human Research Facility 1 (HRF-1) provides an on-orbit laboratory that enables scientists conducting human life science research to evaluate the physiological, behavioural, and chemical changes induced by space flight. Research performed using the HRF-1 provides data to help scientists understand how the human body adapts to long-duration space flight.
- HRF-1 consists of items mounted in a rack (based on the EXpedite the PRocessing of Experiments to Space Station (EXPRESS) rack design) as well as equipment kept in stowage and brought out as needed.

== Description ==
Human Research Facility 1 (HRF-1) was launched aboard STS-102 (Discovery) March 8, 2001. The HRF-1 drawers provide power, command and data handling, cooling air and water, pressurized gas, and vacuum to experiments.

The International Space Station (ISS) moderate temperature cooling loop is extended into the HRF to keep the rack at ambient temperature. The Avionics Air Assembly (AAA), which interfaces with the moderate temperature cooling loop, extracts heat from the air in the rack. Each payload can use up to 2000 W of cooling power. HRF-1 is connected to the ISS video services and Ethernet, which allow the ISS and ground operations crews to control payloads. The rack has front-panel access ports for the laptop, vacuum system, and nitrogen delivery system.

HRF-1 houses many types of equipment. Descriptions are listed below:

- The ultrasound drawer holds ultrasound/Doppler equipment that has research and diagnostic applications. This equipment provides color, two-dimensional analog or digital images that can be downlinked for analysis. This equipment was used to support the Advanced Diagnostic Ultrasound in Microgravity (ADUM) investigation.
- The portable computer is used to install and execute software that supports the experiments. It is used to control equipment; to collect and store data, crew notes, and equipment notes; and to provide uplink and downlink capabilities.
- Workstation 2 is a state-of-the-art computer system that provides a platform for the installation and execution of software that is used in various investigations. The workstation is capable of data collection and archiving, downlink, display, video processing, graphics support, user and HRF rack interfacing, crew notes, and crew tests. It can be connected to one or more drawers in HRF-1 for use in experiment
- Two cooling stowage drawers provide stowage for equipment. When in operation, the drawers maintain a uniform temperature by removing the heat generated by the powered payloads that use HRF-1.
- The Space Linear Acceleration Mass Measurement Device (SLAMMD) was installed in the HRF-1 during Expedition 11. The SLAMMD measures the on-orbit mass of the crewmembers by applying Newton's second law of motion (force is equal to mass times acceleration). This device can measure a mass between 95 and 240 lb using the force generated by two springs inside the SLAMMD drawer. Each spring is attached to a cam, which is also attached to a centrally located shaft with a flywheel mounted on top of it. The cam is designed such that, as the springs are stretched over a distance, a constant force is applied to the central shaft. A lanyard wrapped around the large flywheel is fed through a small slit on the SLAMMD front panel. The lanyard is latched onto the SLAMMD guiding arm, where the crewmember sits for a body mass measurement. Attached to the guiding arm is a leg support assembly around which the crew-member wraps his or her legs (as one would for a leg curl machine), a belly pad to help align the stomach, and a headrest.

HRF-1 was originally launched with the following components: the ultrasound, Gas Analyzer System for Metabolic Analysis Physiology (GASMAP), portable computer, workstation, and cooling stowage drawers. During Expedition 11, the GASMAP was moved to Human Research Facility 2 (HRF-2), and SLAMMD was moved to HRF-1 from HRF-2. During Expedition 13, the original workstation was replaced with the Workstation 2.

== Operations ==
Payloads in the HRF-1 can operate independently regardless of their cooling and power needs and flight schedule. The HRF power converter delivers 120 V of direct current (DC) power from the utility outlet panel to the rack and converts it to 28 V DC for distribution to the payloads. Payload computer and video operations can be conducted from the ground or on the space station. The crew performs periodic checks of all connections and hardware and performs payload operations as needed.

== See also ==
- Scientific research on the ISS

== Gallery ==
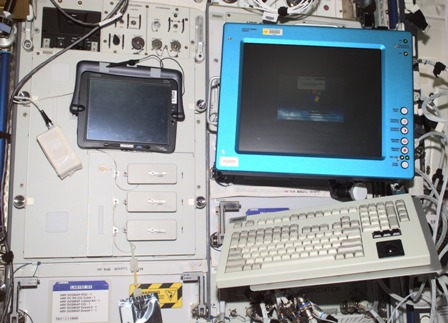
Astronaut Donald R. Pettit, Expedition 6 NASA ISS science officer, works to set up Pulmonary Function in Flight (PuFF) hardware in preparation for a Human Research Facility (HRF) experiment in the Destiny laboratory on the International Space Station (ISS). Expedition 6 was the fourth and final expedition crew to perform the HRF PuFF experiment on the ISS. - NASA Image: ISS006E07133

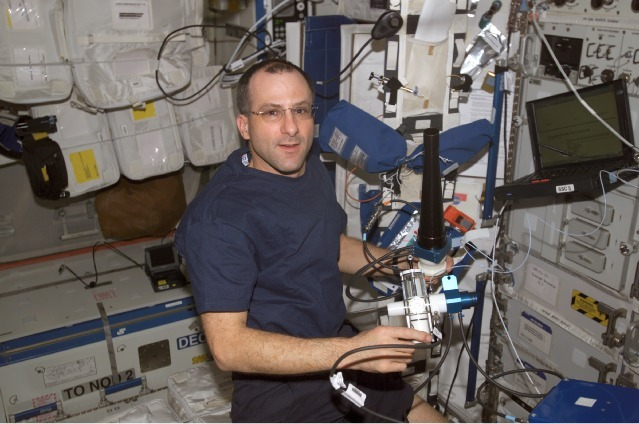
Expedition 8 mission commander and science officer Michael Foale is shown wearing a customized Lower Extremity Monitoring Suit (LEMS) and balancing on the footplate of a special track attached to the Human Research Facility (HRF) rack in the Destiny laboratory to perform a calibration for the Foot Reaction Forces During Spaceflight (Foot) experiment. - NASA Image: ISS08E06860

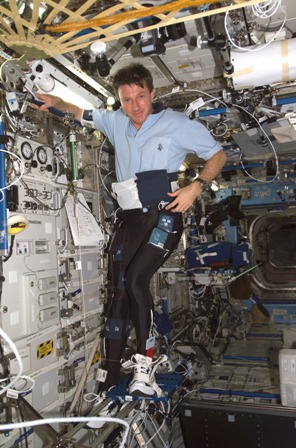
Astronaut Bill McArthur sets up the Space Linear Acceleration Mass Measurement Device (SLAMMD) in the Destiny laboratory during Expedition 12. The SLAMMD guiding arm, leg restraint, and head rest are attached to the Human Research Facility 1 (HRF-1). - NASA Image: ISS012E12597

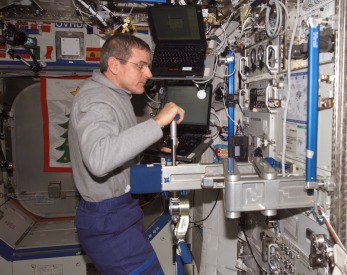
View of astronaut Jeffrey N. Williams, NASA Expedition 13 science officer and flight engineer, inserting a subrack payload into the Human Research Facility (HRF) in the U.S. Laboratory, Destiny. - NASA Image ISS013E38340
