= Human Research Facility Holter Monitor =

International Space Station experiment

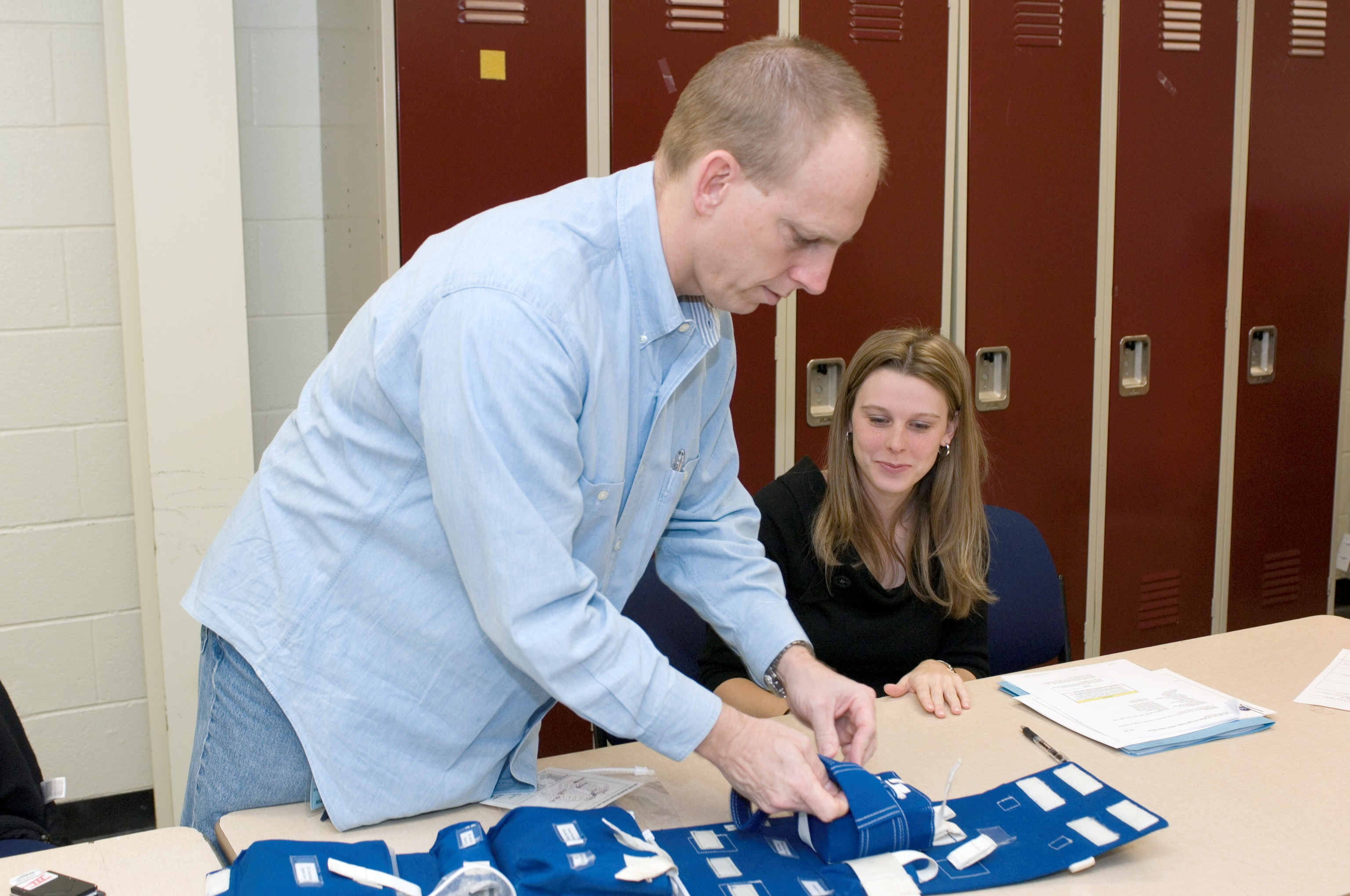
Astronaut Clayton Anderson trains for Expedition 14 Holter operations with instructor Ashley Weaver at the Johnson Space Center in Houston.

The Human Research Facility Holter Monitor (Holter) is a battery-powered, noninvasive electrocardiogram (ECG) device that accurately measures the heart rate of crew members over an extended period of time (up to 24 or 48 hours). ECG information is stored on a Portable Computer Memory Card International Adapter (PCMCIA) card and downlinked to Earth for analysis after monitoring is complete.

== Description ==
Facility Summary :

- The Human Research Facility Holter Monitor (Holter) is a modified commercial off-the-shelf (COTS) device that accurately records the electrical activity of a crew-member's heart over an extended period of time (up to 24 or 48 hours). This noninvasive electrocardiogram (ECG) device is available to support future experiments.
- The Holter is a three-channel, seven-lead ECG that can be placed in a variety of configurations, powered by one, two, or three 9V alkaline batteries, depending on the length of recording and desired sampling rate.
- The Holter contains a removable Portable Computer Memory Card International Adapter (PCMCIA) card that allows the data to be stored, downloaded to a personal computer, and downlinked.

The Human Research Facility Holter Monitor (Holter) measures and records the electrical activity of a crew member's heart. The Holter is a battery-powered digital recorder that is capable of recording the electrocardiogram (ECG) data continuously for up to 24 or 48 hours. The Holter currently in use on the International Space Station is manufactured by Spacelabs Healthcare, Incorporated, of Issaquah, Washington.

The Holter measures heart rates ranging from 0 to 240 beats per minute (bpm) at a sampling rate of 128 or 256 Hz. It measures ECG signals ranging from -2.5 to +2.5 mV (normal mode) and -5 to +5 mV (half-gain mode) at a sampling rate of 128 Hz or 256 Hz with an accuracy of +/- 2 percent of full range.

== Operations ==
The Human Research Facility (HRF) Holter accessories kit is stowed during launch and landing. Prior to using the Holter, the crew-member takes the HRF Holter accessories kit from stowage, uses the razor to shave the electrode sites, wipes the area clean with biocide wipes, and applies the electrode pads to the chest in the configuration depicted on the placard. The crew-member then dons the hardware, attaches the Holter harness to the main unit, and activates the hardware. At the end of the recording period, the crew-member deactivates, doffs, and stows the hardware. For data download, the crew-member removes the hard disk card assembly from the main unit, plugs the card into the HRF personal computer (PC), and downloads the data to the HRF PC. Downlink of the Holter data is accomplished as part of HRF rack activities.

== See also ==
Scientific research on the ISS
