= European Physiology Modules =

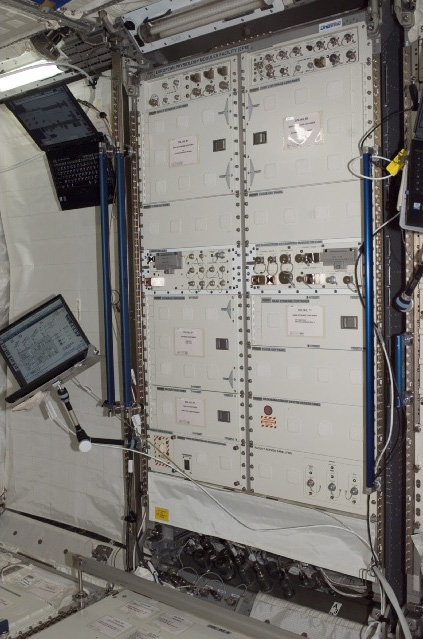
European Physiology Modules (EPM) installed in the Columbus Laboratory on board the ISS.

The European Physiology Module (EPM) is an International Standard Payload Rack for the Columbus Laboratory on board the International Space Station. The EPM rack was built by OHB-System in Bremen.

The EPM enables a better understanding of the effects of spaceflight on the human body. Research typically includes neuroscientific, cardiovascular, and physiological studies and investigations of metabolic processes.

The EPM performs physiological and biomedical tests and transmits the data to Earth for further analysis. The resulting data will provide insight into the human body's processes in a microgravity environment.

The EPM provides equipment for the study of the human body, including three science modules: two active modules, CARDIOLAB and MEEMM, and one module (sample collection kit, or SCK) that includes equipment to enable collection of biological samples (blood, urine, and saliva).

== Description ==
The facility will consist of separate modules in which investigators can install their hardware for study of the human body on ISS. The Cardiolab (CDL) and the Multi Electrodes Encephalogram Measurement Module (MEEMM) will be initially launched with the EPM facility.

The European Physiology Module is a double-rack multi-user facility that supports investigations of respiratory and cardiovascular conditions, hormonal and body fluid shift, bone demineralization and neuroscience. The facility is based on a modular design concept to support diverse experiments. Human physiology experiments are aimed primarily at increasing our knowledge of how the human body reacts to long-duration weightlessness. However, this area of research also contributes to an increased understanding of terrestrial problems such as the ageing process, osteoporosis, balance disorders, and muscle wasting. Typical research areas include:

- Neuroscience - Neurovestibular control of posture, balance, and motion sensory coordination
- Cardiovascular and Respiratory Systems - Control of blood volume and distribution; fluid volume shift
- Bone and Muscle Physiology - Muscle de-conditioning/atrophy
- Endocrinology, Nutrition and Metabolism - Hormonal regulation; demineralization

To correctly evaluate the on-board data, it is essential that reference (or baseline) data are collected prior to flight and following the return of the crew-members to Earth. For this reason, the EPM facility will provide a Baseline Data Collection Model (BDCM) system that includes functional copies of the on-board instruments. The BDCM will be readily transportable to ensure availability of the equipment for the pre-flight, launch and post-flight activities.

== Containers and operation ==
The European Physiology Module includes the following science containers for medical experiments:

- Multi-Electrode Electroencephalography Module (MEEMM) - For neurologic scans of the brain. (Built by EREMS in Toulouse.)
- Samples Collection Kit (SCK) - Collection of different medical instruments and boxes for biologic probes.
- Cardiolab (CDL) - To scan the cardiovascular system. (Built by CADMOS in Toulouse.)

The EPM is operated according to ESA's decentralised payload operation concept. The Facility Responsible Centre (FRC) for the EPM is CADMOS, located in Toulouse, France.

The different EPM models are:

- Flight Model (FM) - Delivered September 2005 to EADS SPACE Transportation, Bremen for integration.
- Trainings Model (TRM) - Delivered to the European Astronaut Centre (EAC), ESA in Cologne.
- Ground Model (GM-1) - Delivered July 2005 to the FRC, CADMOS.
- Ground Model (GM-2) - To be delivered in March 2006 to the Lyndon B. Johnson Space Center (JSC), NASA.
- Baseline Data Collection Model (BDCM) - Delivered in October 2005 to the FRC, CADMOS.

== Gallery ==
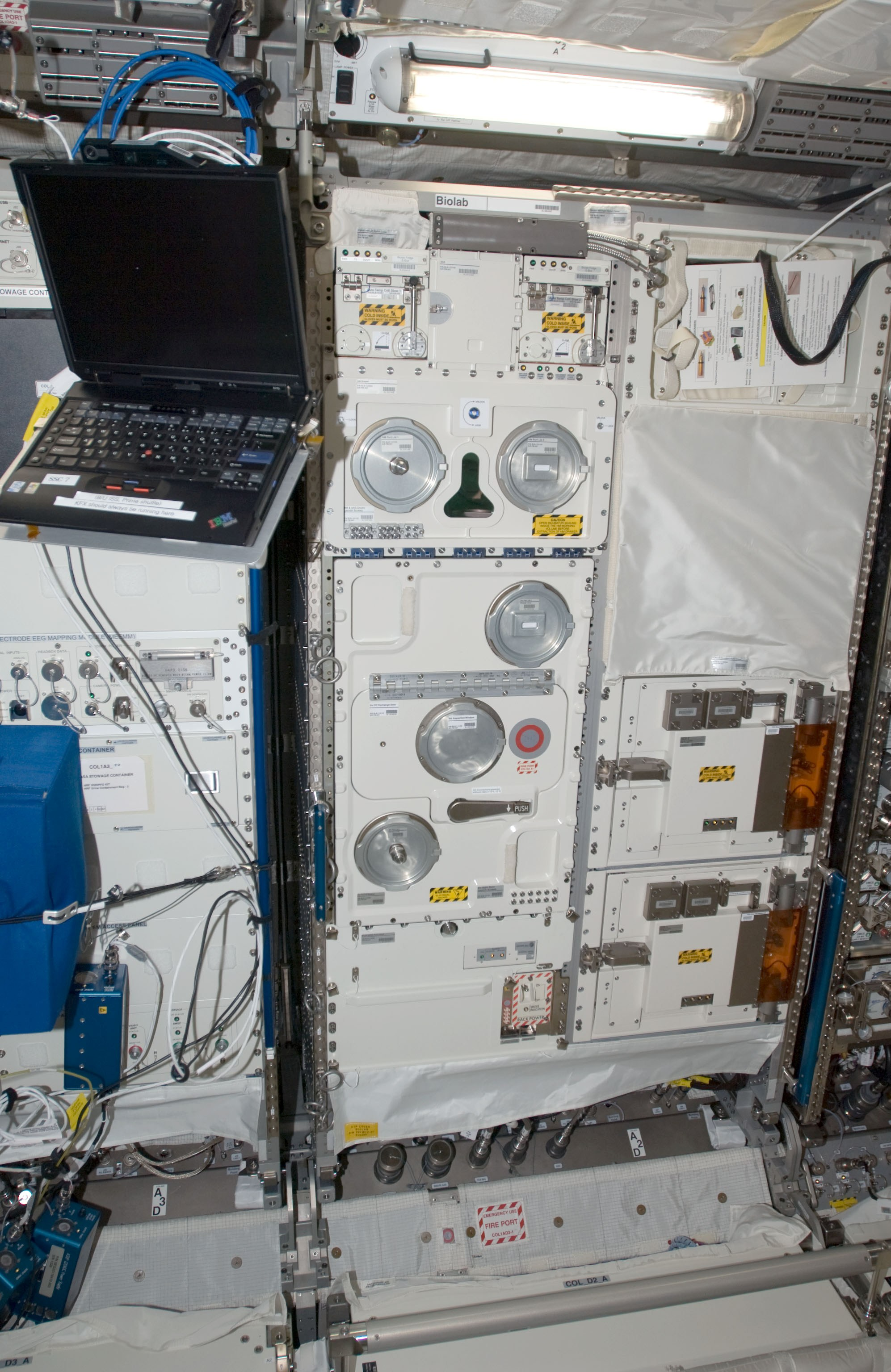
NASA Image: ISS018E032095: The photo shows Human Research Facility (HRF) rack 2; the European Physiology Module (EPM) is visible. Three-dimensional modeling of International Space Station Interior and Exterior project. Taken for PhotoSynth

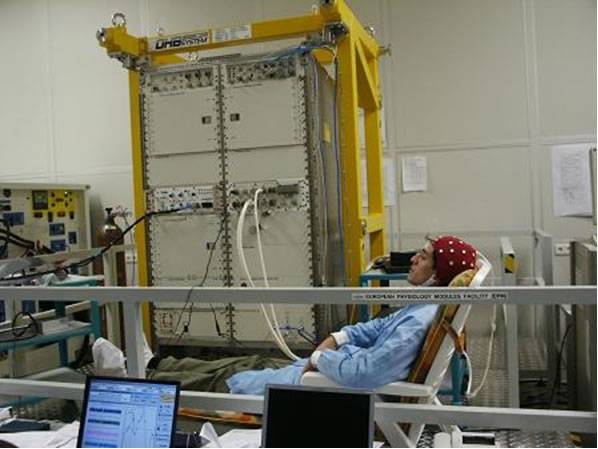
Testing of one of the experiment modules for European Physiology Module (EPM). Image provided by O. Amend.

== See also ==
- Scientific research on the ISS
