= European Drawer Rack =

Payload rack installed in the Columbus lab of the ISS

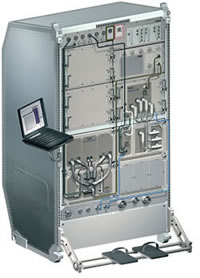
The European Drawer Rack (EDR) with the Protein Crystallization Diagnostics Facility and the Facility for Adsorption and Surface Tension payloads integrated.

The European Drawer Rack (EDR) is a single, six-post International Standard Payload Rack (ISPR) with seven Experiment Modules (EMs), each of which has separate access to power and cooling. A video management unit sends streaming video, images, and science data to Earth via the Columbus module's high-rate data link and can temporarily store 72 GB of video. The experiments are largely autonomous to minimize data transfer requirements, though the EDR can be operated remotely via telescience or in real time by the crew via a dedicated laptop. The EDR has two different types of EMs: the standard International Space Station locker and the standard eight panel unit International Subrack Interface Standard (ISIS) drawer.

== Overview ==
EDR is a multi-user facility on board the International Space Station that accommodates a variety of science experiments. It is located in the Columbus Laboratory module and was developed for the European Space Agency by Alenia Spazio, a subsidiary of Thales Alenia Space. Like other payload racks in the station, the physical characteristics of EDR conform to the International Standard Payload Rack specification.

EDR provides accommodation for up to 3 ISIS Drawers, and 4 ISS Lockers. These standardized ECMs (Experiment Container Modules) can contain scientific experiments. EDR provides the following services to the ECMs:

- Stowage space
- Power supply (28 V DC, 120 V DC)
- Low Rate telecommand/telemetry (19.2 kbit/s RS-422)
- Medium Rate telecommand/telemetry (10 Mbit/s Ethernet)
- High Rate telemetry (32 Mbit/s SpaceWire)
- Analogue video acquisition (NTSC)
- Discrete commanding, monitoring and temperature monitoring services
- Air cooling
- Water cooling
- Gaseous Nitrogen supply
- Vacuum service
- Waste gas service
- Timeline service
- Ancillary data and time services
- Laptop crew interface

The following ESA payloads are designed for use in EDR:

- PCDF (Protein Crystallisation and Diagnostics Facility);
- FASTER (Facility for Adsorption and Surface Tension).

EDR is operated according to ESA's decentralised payload operation concept. The FRC (Facility Responsible Centre) for EDR is Erasmus USOC, located at ESTEC, Noordwijk, The Netherlands.

== Gallery ==
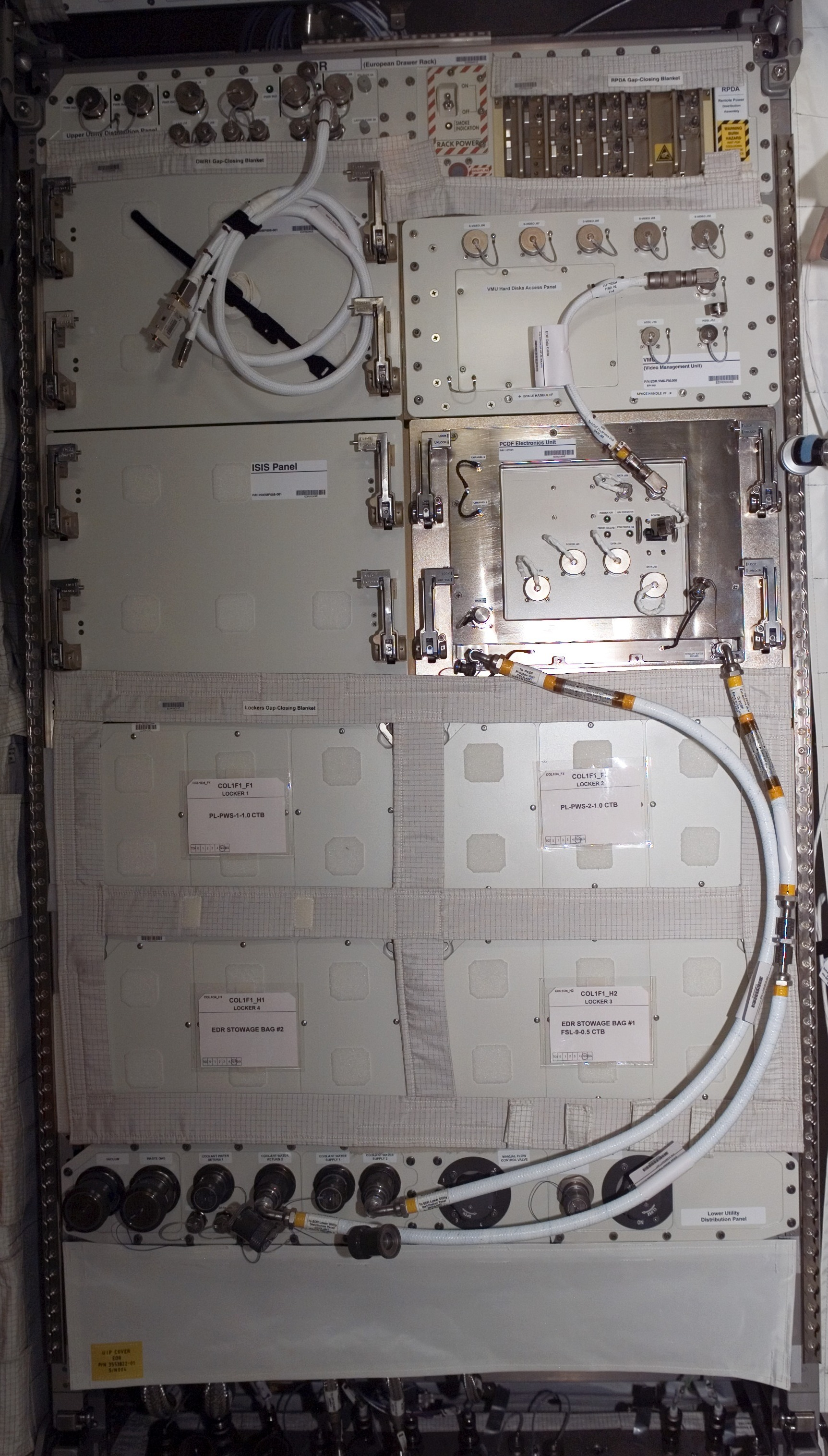
The European Drawer Rack (EDR) installed in the Columbus laboratory. Image taken during Expedition 16.

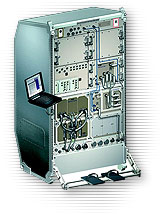
European Drawer Rack (NASA)

== See also ==
- Scientific research on the ISS
