= Biolab =

Science payload fitted inside the Columbus laboratory of the ISS

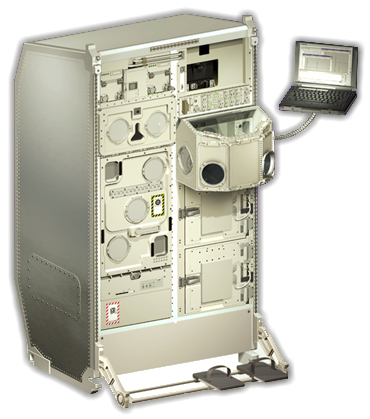
Biolab (ESA)

Biolab (Biological Experiment Laboratory) is a single-rack multi-user science payload designed for use in the Columbus laboratory of the International Space Station. Biolab supports biological research on small plants, small invertebrates, microorganisms, animal cells, and tissue cultures. It includes an incubator equipped with centrifuges in which the preceding experimental subjects can be subjected to controlled levels of accelerations.

These experiments help to identify "the role that microgravity plays at all levels of an organism, from the effects on a single cell up to a complex organism including humans."

== Description ==
Summary :

- BioLab provides an on-orbit biology laboratory that enables scientists to study the effects of microgravity and space radiation on unicellular and multicellular organisms, including bacteria, insects, protists (simple eukaryotic organisms), seeds, and cells.
- The BioLab facility includes an incubator, microscope, spectrophotometer (instrument used to measure the spectrum of light absorbed by a sample), and two centrifuges to provide artificial gravity. BioLab allows researchers to illuminate and observe individual experiment containers (ECs), and BioLab's life support system can regulate the content of the atmosphere (including humidity).
- BioLab is integrated into a single International Standard Payload Rack (ISPR) within the European Columbus laboratory, which was launched on space shuttle mission STS-122.
- Results from BioLab experiments could affect biomedical research in areas such as immunology, pharmacology, bone demineralization, cellular signal transduction (the processing of electrochemical stimuli in cells), cellular repair, and biotechnology.

The BioLab facility, which has been integrated into a single International Standard Payload Rack (ISPR) in the European Columbus laboratory, is divided into two sections: the automated section, or core unit, and the manual section, designed for crew interaction with the experiments. The core unit, which can operate autonomously or telerobotically (via commands sent from the ground), consists of a large incubator, two centrifuges, a microscope, a spectrophotometer (an instrument used to measure the spectrum of light absorbed by a sample), a sample-handling mechanism, and Automatic Temperature-Controlled Stowage (ATCS) to keep small amounts of sample. The manual section consists of the Experiment Preparation Unit (EPU), the BioGloveBox (BGB), and additional Temperature Control Units (TCUs) for storing experiment containers (ECs) and preserving samples.

The EC is designed to enclose a variety of biological samples and provide an interface with the other BioLab subsystems, such as power, data, and life support. The standard EC measures 6 x 6 x 10 cm, whereas the Advanced EC, which is capable of video, measures 10.8 x 15 x 13.7 cm. The incubator is capable of maintaining ECs at a temperature between 18 and 40 C with an accuracy of 0.5 C. The two centrifuges located inside the incubator are capable of providing artificial gravity in the range of 0.001 to 2 G (G is the gravitational acceleration at the Earth's surface). An array of light emitting diodes (LEDs) is used to provide white light illumination as well as infrared observation.

BioLab's Handling Mechanism (HM) is a robotic arm that provides an interface between the ECs and BioLab's analytical instruments, the microscope and spectrophotometer. BioLab's microscope, which can be controlled by investigators on the ground, has a resolution that ranges from 0.6 to 1.8 micrometers (μm) with a 0.25 μm and 1.0 μm diameter field of view, respectively. The spectrophotometer, which uses tungsten and deuterium lamps, can analyze light passed through the sample in the spectral range of 220 to 900 nm (ultraviolet, visible, and near infrared) with a resolution of 10 nm. Finally, the HM also allows automated transfer of samples from the incubator to the ATCS, which can maintain temperatures between -20 and 10 C with an accuracy of +/- 1 C.

In the manual section, the BGB, which has a working volume of 32 L, allows manipulation of the experiment hardware in a closed, controlled environment. It also provides disinfection of the working volume using an ozone gas (O3) unit. The Thermo-Electrical Unit (TEU) maintains air temperature inside the BGB between 21 and 38 C with an accuracy of +/- 2 C. Lastly, the two TCUs allow storage of ECs and ATCS inserts before and after use at an adjustable temperature between -20 and 10 C with an accuracy of +/- 1 C.

== Launch ==
Biolab was pre-installed inside the Columbus laboratory. Space Shuttle Atlantis on ISS Assembly Flight 1E, mission STS-122, successfully delivered the Columbus module to the ISS on February 9, 2008.

== Related publications ==
- Brinckmann E, Schiller P. Experiments with small animals in BIOLAB and EMCS on the International Space Station. Advances in Space Research; 30(4):809-814. 2002
- Serafini L, Vigano W, Donati A, Porciani M, Zolesi V, Schulze-Varnholt D, Manieri P, El-Din Sallam A, Schmaeh M, Horn ER. The development of the hardware for studying biological clock systems under microgravity conditions, using scorpions as animal models. Acta Astronautica; 60:420-425 2007

== See also ==
- Scientific research on the ISS
- Astrobotany

== Gallery ==
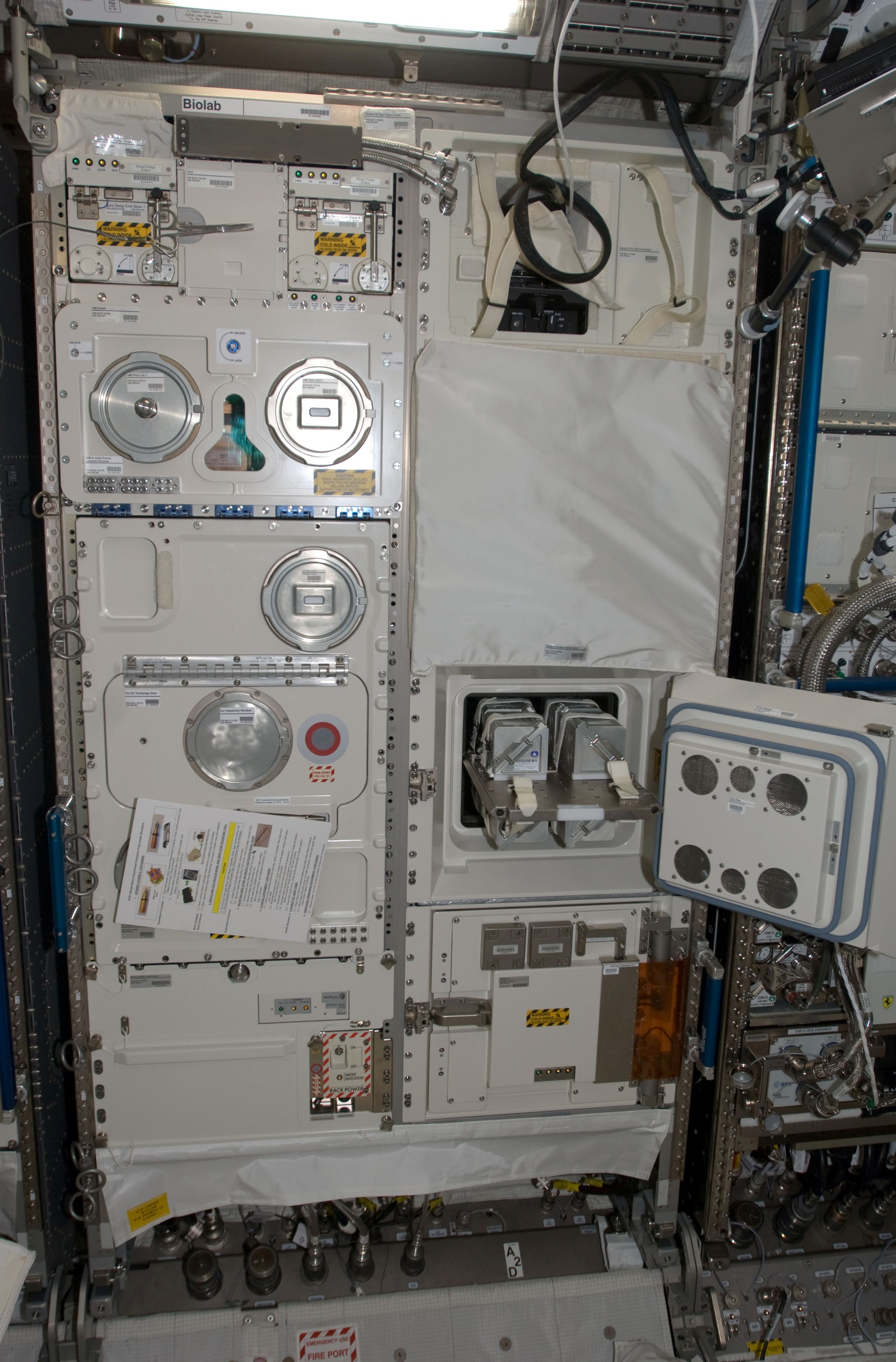
NASA Image: ISS018E012153 - BioLab facility in the Columbus module. Image taken during Expedition 18.

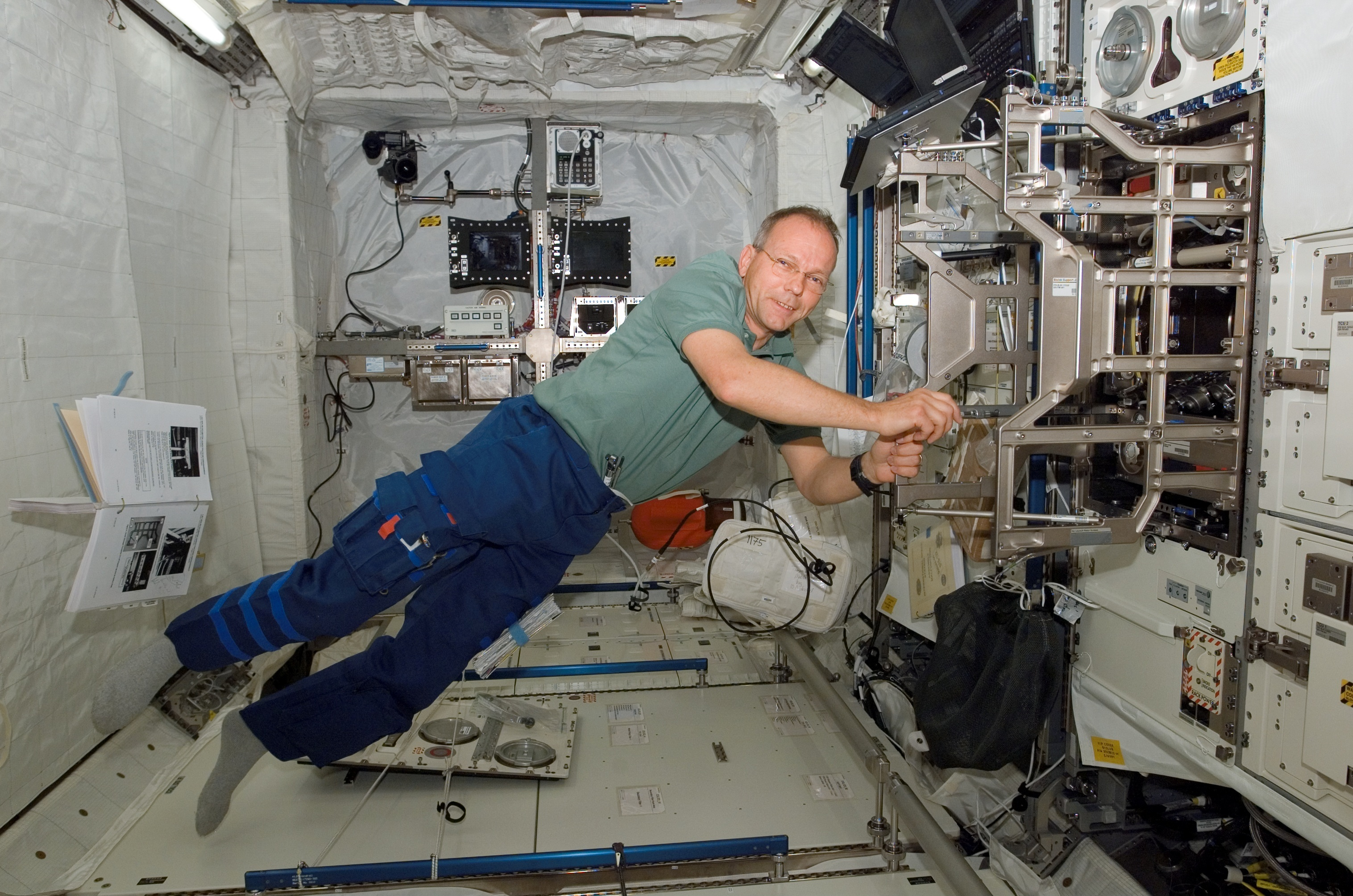
NASA Image: S122-E-008899: European Space Agency astronaut Hans Schlegel, STS-122 mission specialist, continues work to ready the agency's new Columbus laboratory for duty aboard the International Space Station.

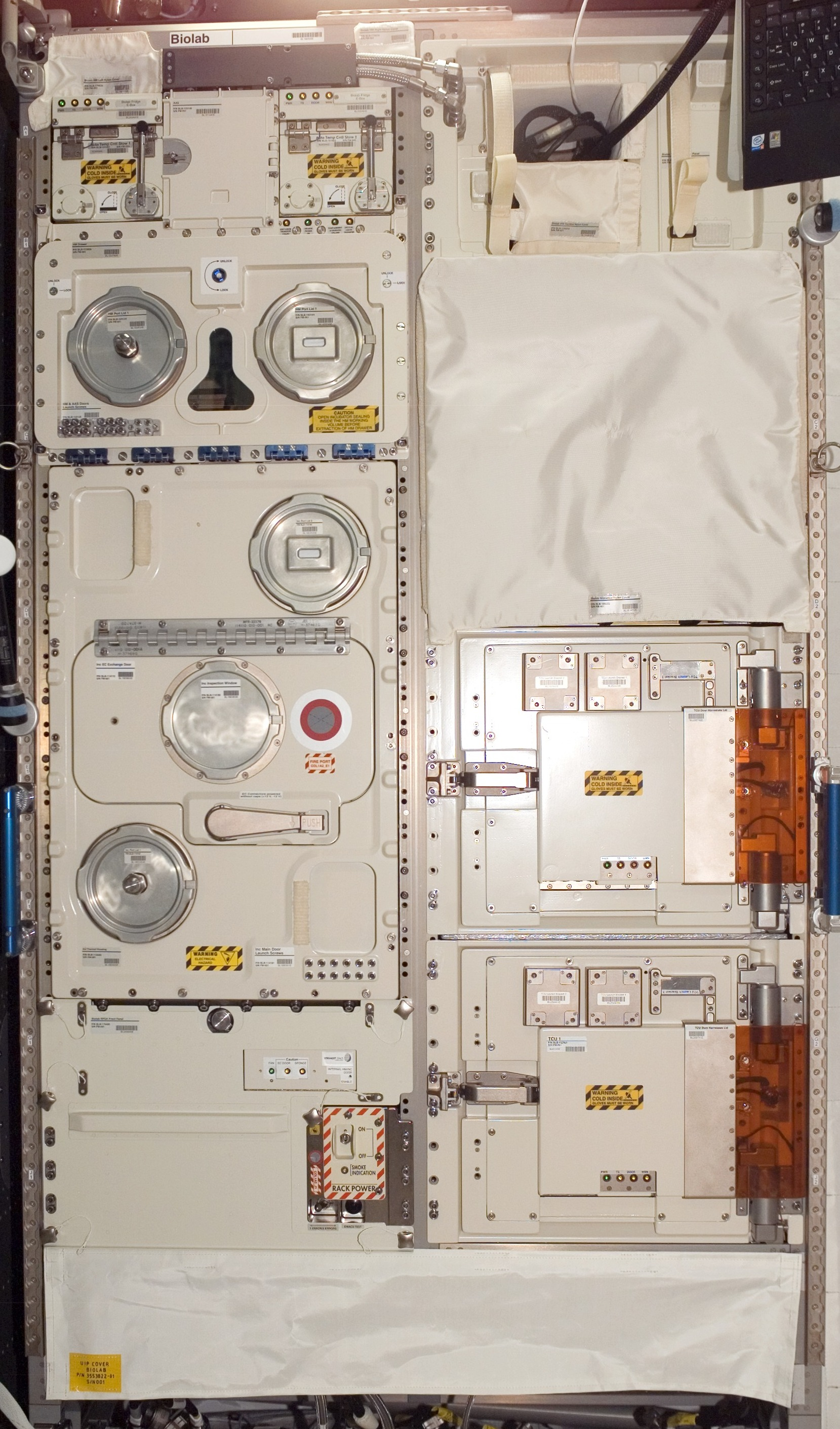
NASA Image: ISS016E030923 - BioLab facility in the Columbus module. Image taken during Expedition 16.
