= Einstein-Elevator =

Facility in Germany for microgravity research

Coordinates: 52.3880°N 9.7124°E

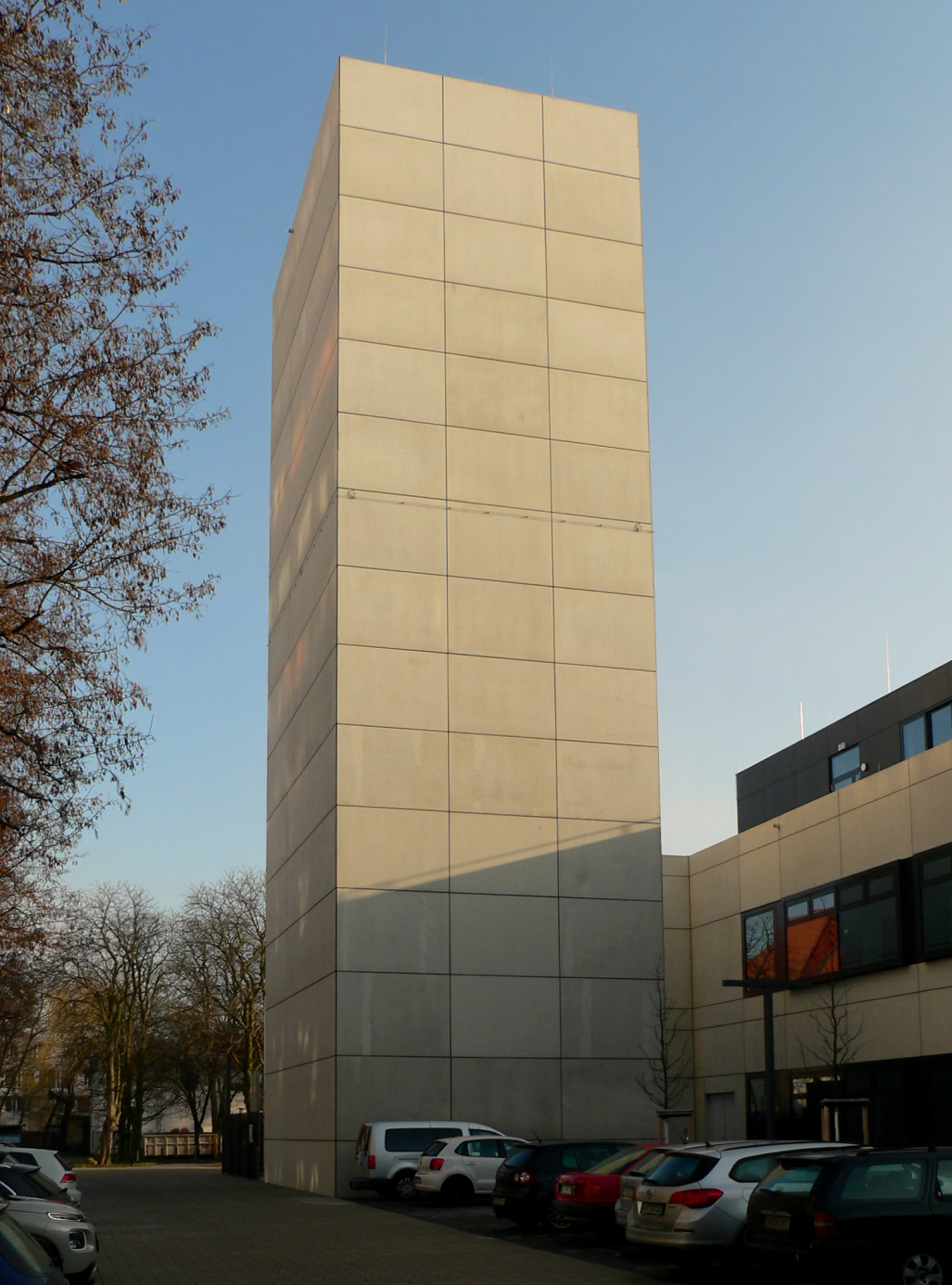
Tower-shaped part of the Einstein-Elevator building

The Einstein-Elevator is a research platform for earthbound experiments under zero gravity conditions. Unlike other drop towers, only the experimental vessel is evacuated, and the tower itself is not evacuated, allowing a significantly higher repetition rate to be achieved. In addition, mechanical guides achieve lower rotational movements than in free fall. The first "flight" of the capsule in the Einstein-Elevator took place in October 2019, while research operations began in 2020. The facility is part of the Hannover Institute of Technology at Leibniz University Hannover.

== Theory ==
The theoretical basis for the Einstein-Elevator is Albert Einstein's thought experiment on the equivalence principle, hence the name Einstein-Elevator. This states that an observer in a closed room cannot experimentally prove whether the room is, for example, in the gravitational field of the earth with the acceleration due to gravity or whether the room is experiencing an acceleration in space. Similarly, the observer cannot prove whether the room is in zero gravity in space or in free fall in the Earth's gravitational field.

== Concept and design ==
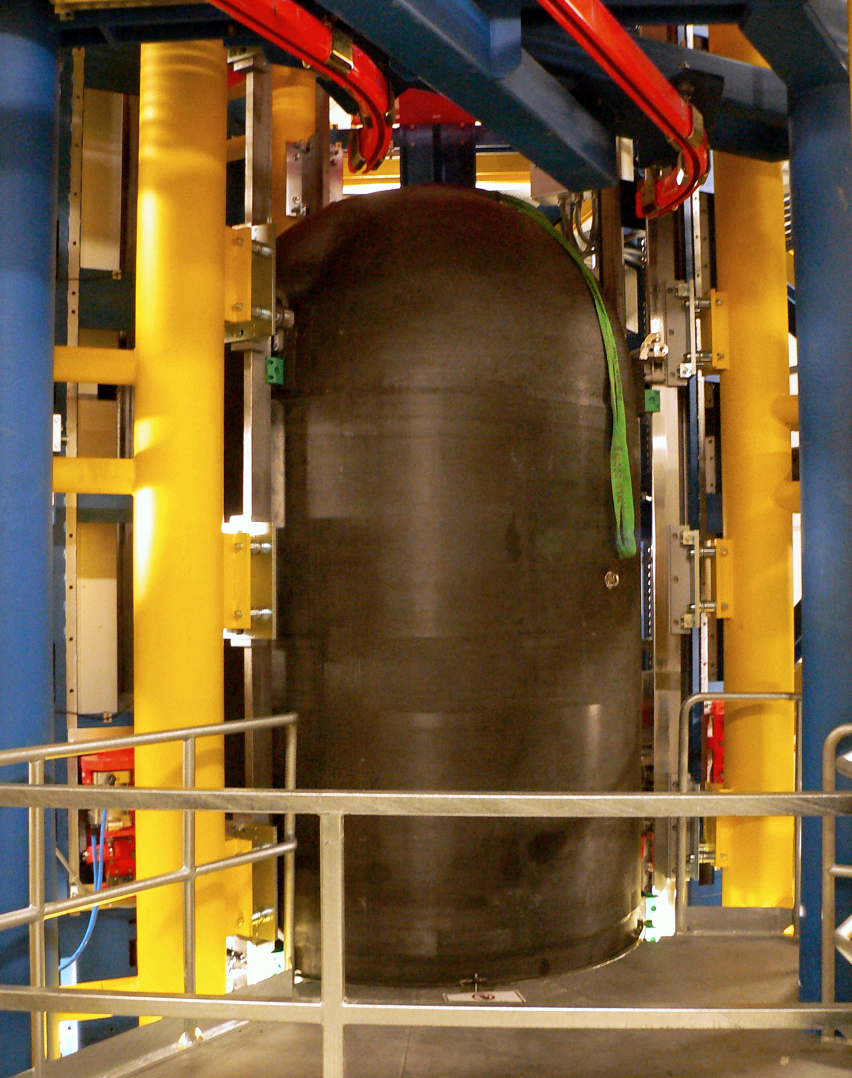
The drop capsule

In classic drop towers, such as the Bremen drop tower, the experiment is either dropped in a large vacuum tube in a drop capsule or launched by a catapult. The Einstein-Elevator is a modification of the classic drop tower, as the entire tower tube does not serve as a vacuum chamber. Instead, the vacuum is generated in a small vacuum chamber, the so-called gondola, into which the experiment carrier is placed. The gondola is accelerated vertically by linear motors at gravitational acceleration. This movement largely corresponds to a free fall. The experiment inside the gondola is therefore weightless. It can free fall for four seconds without any mechanical connection to the gondola.

Unlike a normal drop tower, only the gondola needs to be evacuated, not the entire tower. This results in a repetition rate of up to 300 attempts per day.

=== Design ===
The tower design of the Einstein-Elevator consists of an inner support structure for the drive guidance of the linear motors and an outer support structure for the gondola guidance, as electric drives and roller guides, such as those used in elevator systems, always generate vibrations. The tower-in-tower design is intended to ensure that these disturbing influences do not affect the experiments inside the gondola. The free fall conditions are fulfilled in the Einstein-Elevator over a distance of 20 m, resulting in a duration of weightlessness of approx. 4 seconds. The payload available for experiments should be a maximum of 1,000 kg with a test carrier diameter of 1.7 m and a height of 2 m for the experimental setup.

=== Procedure ===
For an experiment, the gondola is first accelerated upwards at five times the acceleration due to gravity until it reaches a speed of around 20 m/s. Linear motors are used for this acceleration. After the acceleration phase, the gondola is accelerated downwards for a short time at slightly more than the acceleration due to gravity so that the experiment detaches from the gondola floor. The gondola is then accelerated downwards as precisely as possible with the acceleration due to gravity. To do this, the linear drives compensate for the air and rolling resistance of the gondola in the gondola guide. The experiment experiences a maximum residual acceleration of 10^{−6} g. Shortly before the end of the free fall, the gondola is moved downwards at slightly less than the acceleration due to gravity so that the experiment touches down on the gondola again in a controlled manner. The gondola is then brought to a standstill with the help of eddy current brakes.

=== Building ===
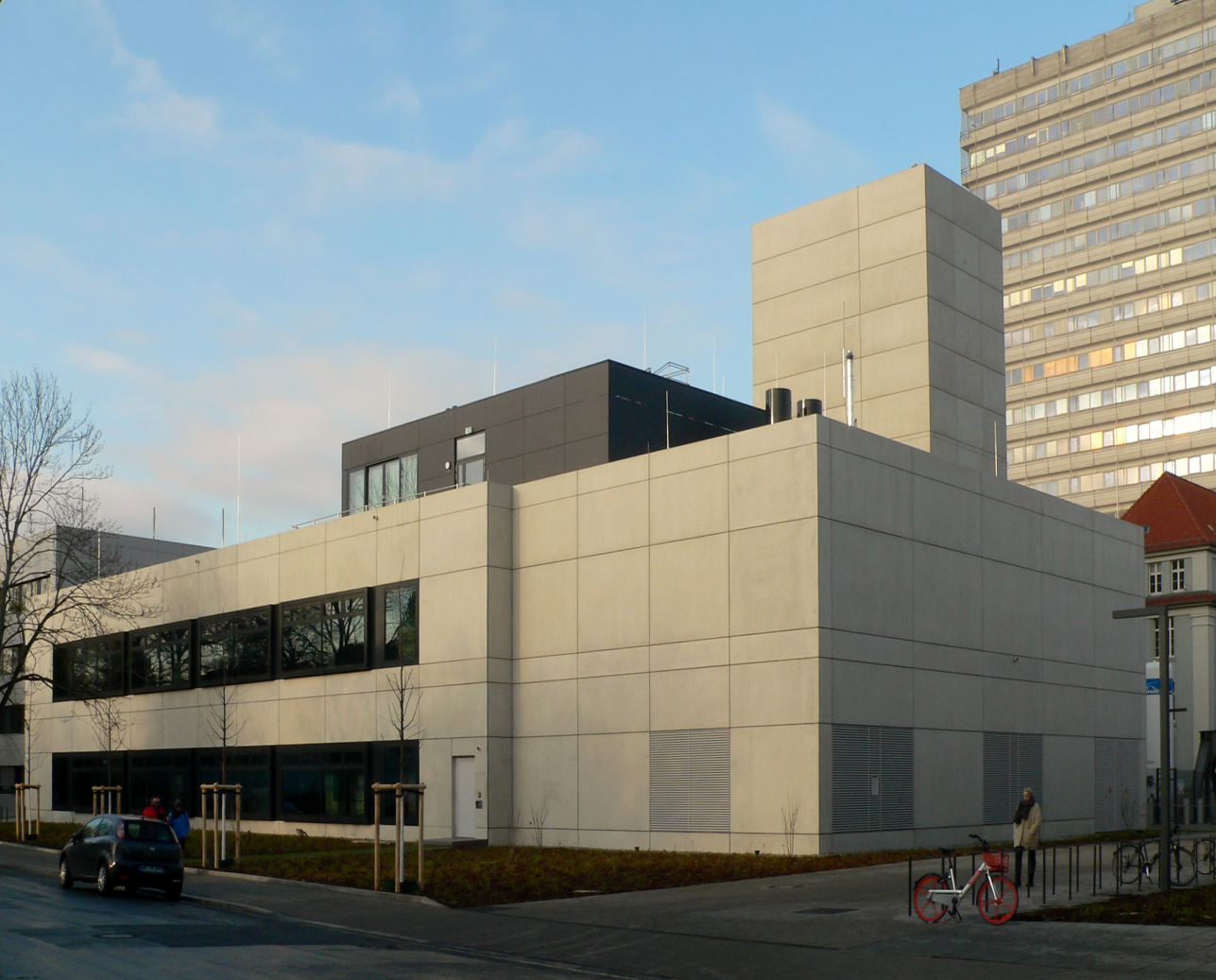
The HITec research building with the Einstein-Elevator, 2019

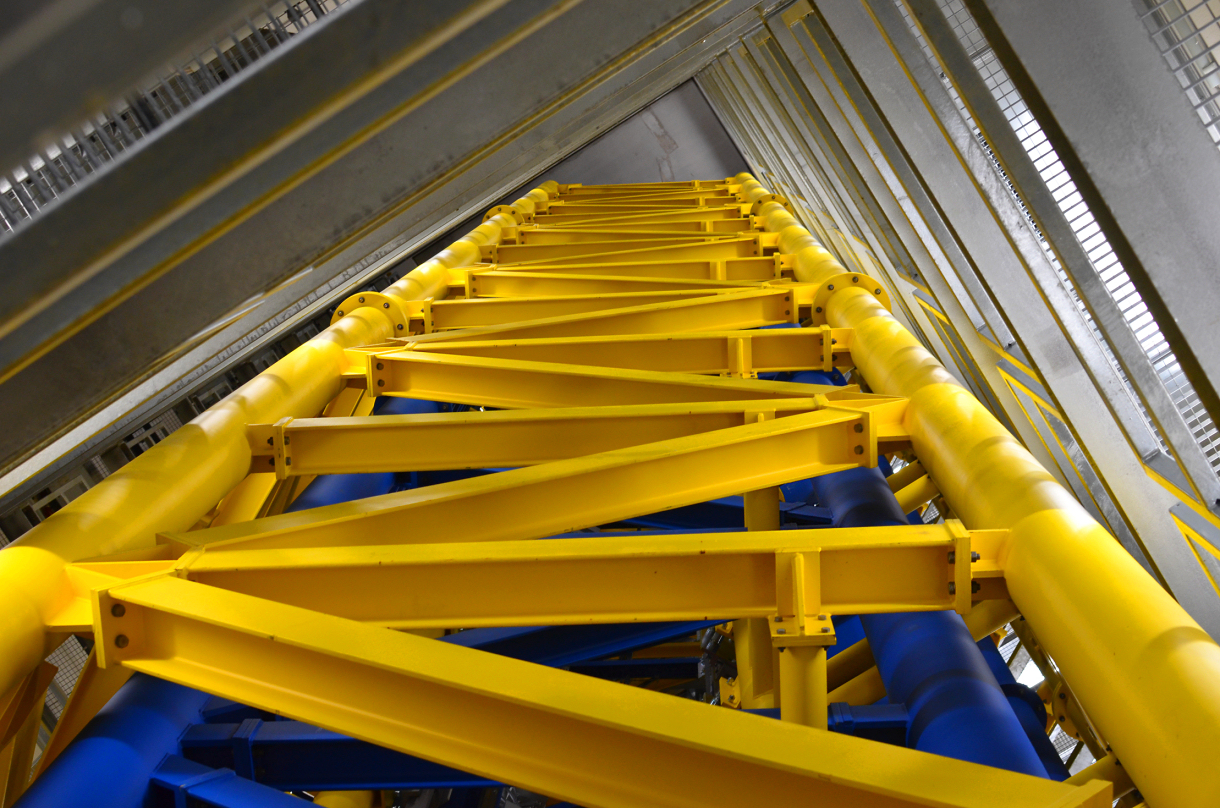
The supporting structure inside the Einstein-Elevator

The Einstein-Elevator is housed in a separate part of the new HITec building, the foundation stone for which was laid in early 2015 and the topping-out ceremony was held in mid-2016. Completion of the research building was planned for the end of 2017. The tower-like part of the building has a height of approx. 30 m above ground level and a total height of approx. 40 m. The lowest basement level is approx. 10 m below ground level. The concrete shell of the structure is mechanically decoupled from the rest of the HITec building, which is intended to prevent interference in the sensitive laboratories.

== Research ==
HITec's research focuses on quantum physics, optics and sensor technology as well as solid-state physics and geodesy. In addition to basic research in the field of quantum technologies, HITec's research project aims to develop new quantum technologies and realize new high-precision and sensitive quantum sensors. The Einstein-Elevator will be used to test these new technologies, among other things. Due to the high repetition rate of 300 experiments per day, experiments can be carried out statistically/quantitatively with the Einstein-Elevator.

The area of production technology for use in space has been added as a further research focus. Building on the experience of the participating institutes of mechanical engineering at Leibniz University Hannover, various topics are currently being investigated. The projects are mainly concerned with the influence of gravity on production processes. The focus is on laser deposition welding and the handling of materials. Other topics include the production of optical lenses under different gravitational conditions and substrate-free additive manufacturing using ultrasonic fields in zero gravity
