= Drop tube =

Structure used for zero-G experiments

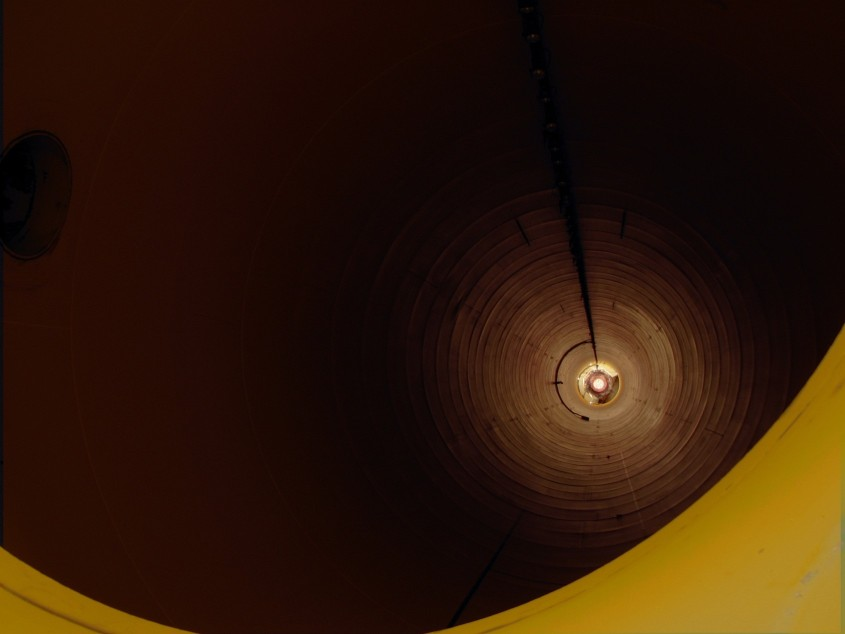
A view down the tube of NASA Glenn's 5 second Zero Gravity Facility.

In physics and materials science, a drop tube or drop tower is a structure used to produce a controlled period of weightlessness for an object under study. Air bags, polystyrene pellets, and magnetic or mechanical brakes are sometimes used to arrest the fall of the experimental payload. In other cases, high-speed impact with a substrate at the bottom of the tower is an intentional part of the experimental protocol.

Not all such facilities are towers: NASA Glenn's Zero Gravity Research Facility is based on a vertical shaft extending to 510 feet (155 m) below ground level.

== Typical operation ==
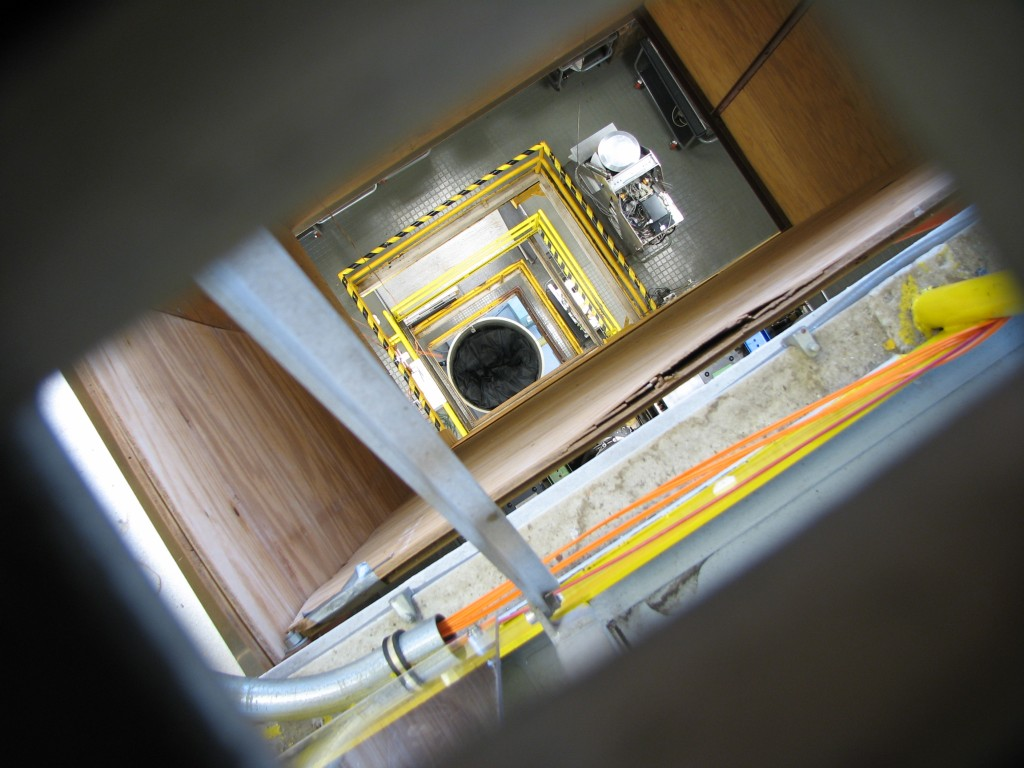
A view down the shaft of NASA Glenn's 2.2 second drop tower. A large (deflated) air bag is at the bottom.

For a typical materials science experiment, a sample of the material under study is loaded into the top of the drop tube, which is filled with inert gas or evacuated to create a low-pressure environment. Following any desired preprocessing (e.g. induction heating to melt a metal alloy), the sample is released to fall to the bottom of the tube. During its flight, or upon impact, the sample can be measured with instruments such as cameras and pyrometers.

Drop towers are also commonly used in combustion research. For this work, oxygen must be present and the payload may be enclosed in a drag shield to isolate it from high-speed "wind" as the apparatus accelerates toward the bottom of the tower.

Fluid physics experiments and development and testing of space-based hardware can also be conducted using drop towers. Sometimes, the ground-based research performed with a drop tower serves as a prelude to more ambitious, in-flight investigations; much longer periods of weightlessness can be achieved with parabolic-flight-path aircraft or with space-based laboratories aboard the Space Shuttle or the International Space Station.

The duration of free-fall produced in a drop tube depends on the length of the tube and its degree of internal evacuation. The 105 metres (344 ft) drop tube at Marshall Space Flight Center produces 4.6 seconds of weightlessness when fully evacuated. In the drop facility Fallturm Bremen at University of Bremen, a catapult can be used to throw the sample upwards in order to prolong the weightlessness from 4.74 to nearly 9.3 seconds. Negating the physical space needed for the initial acceleration, this technique doubles the effective period of weightlessness. The NASA Glenn Research Center has a 5 second drop tower (The Zero Gravity Facility) and a 2.2 second drop tower (The 2.2 Second Drop Tower).

Much of the operating cost of a drop tower is due to the need for evacuation of the drop tube to eliminate the effects of aerodynamic drag. Alternatively, the sample may be placed inside an outer box (called a drag shield) designed to prevent drag.

== Historical uses ==
Though the story may be apocryphal, Galileo is popularly thought to have used the Leaning Tower of Pisa as a drop tower to demonstrate that falling bodies accelerate at the same constant rate regardless of their mass.

Drop towers called shot towers were once useful for making lead shot. A short period of weightlessness allows molten lead to solidify into a quasi-perfect sphere by the time it reaches the floor of the tower.

== List of drop tubes ==
- The vacuum-dynamic stand in Academician V.P.Makeyev State Rocket Centre
- NASA Glenn Research Center 2.2 Second Drop Tower
- NASA Glenn Research Center Zero-G Research Facility
- Micro-Gravity Laboratory of Japan (MGLAB) (Closed June 2010)
- HASTIC 50m Drop Tower, Sapporo
- Fallturm Bremen
- Einstein Elevator Hannover
- Applied Dynamics Laboratories drop tower for spinning spacecraft
- Experimental drop tube of the metallurgy department of Grenoble
- NASA Marshall Space Flight Center Drop Tube Facility is currently mothballed
- Dryden Drop Tower, Portland State University, Maseeh College of Engineering and Computer Science
- National Microgravity Laboratory (China)
- The pagoda at the Royal Botanic Gardens, Kew was used during the Second World War as a drop tower for testing bomb designs.
- Queensland University of Technology drop tower, Brisbane (Closed 2014)

== See also ==
- Glenn Research Center
- Marshall Space Flight Center
- Magnetic levitation
- Microgravity Environment
- Shot tower
- Weightlessness
