= Weightlessness =

Absence of the sensation of weight

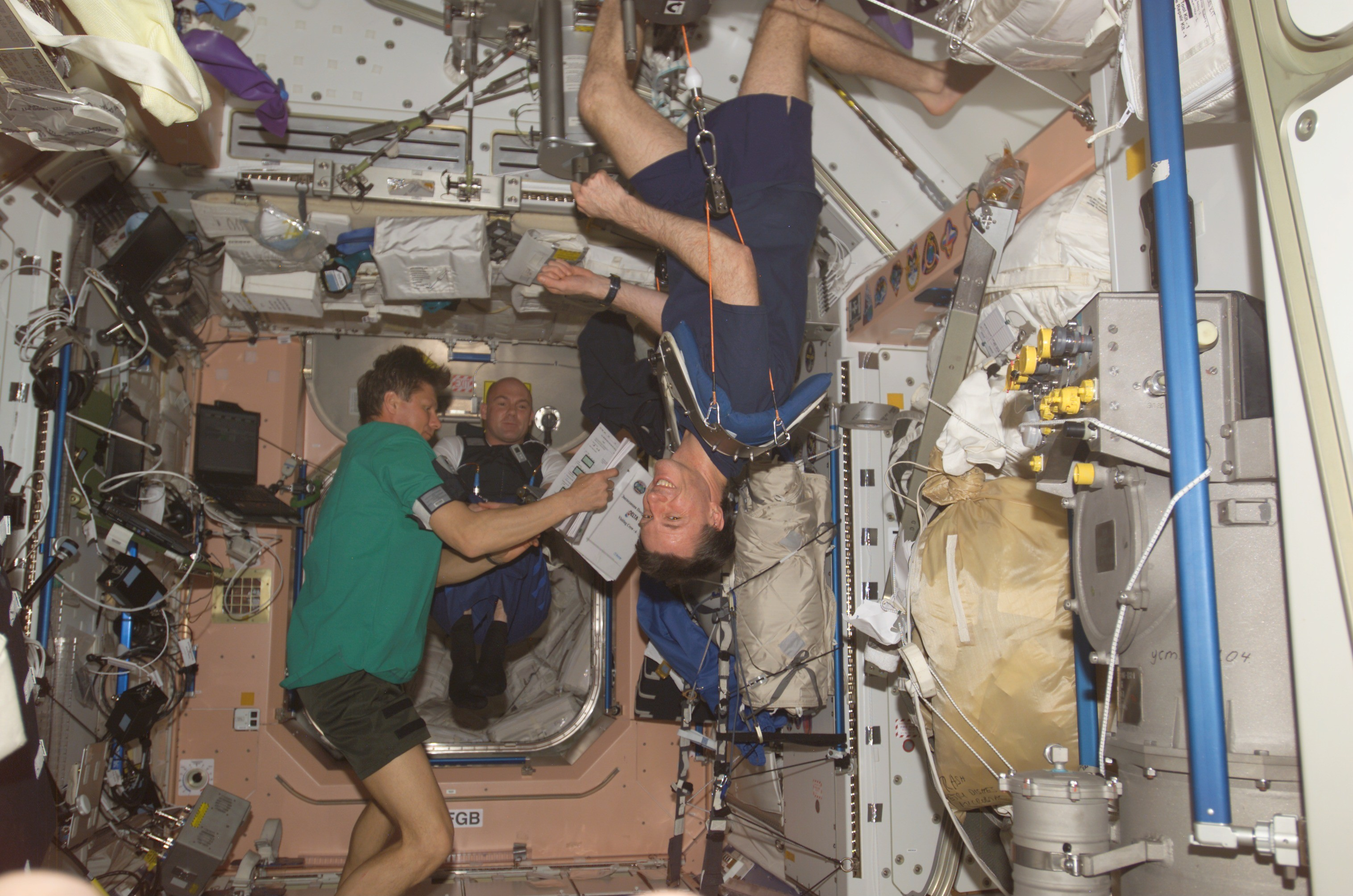
Astronauts on the International Space Station experience only microgravity and thus display an example of weightlessness. Michael Foale can be seen exercising in the foreground.

Weightlessness is the complete or near-complete absence of the sensation of weight, i.e., zero apparent weight. It is also termed zero g-force, or zero-g (named after the g-force) or, misleadingly, zero gravity.

Weight is a measurement of the force on an object at rest in a relatively strong gravitational field (such as on the surface of the Earth). These weight-sensations originate from contact with supporting floors, seats, beds, scales, and the like. A sensation of weight is also produced, even when the gravitational field is zero, when contact forces act upon and overcome a body's inertia by mechanical, non-gravitational forces- such as in a centrifuge, a rotating space station, or within an accelerating vehicle.

When the gravitational field is non-uniform, a body in free fall experiences tidal forces and is not stress-free. Near a black hole, such tidal effects can be very strong, leading to spaghettification. In the case of the Earth, the effects are minor, especially on objects of relatively small dimensions (such as the human body or a spacecraft) and the overall sensation of weightlessness in these cases is preserved. This condition is known as microgravity, and it prevails in orbiting spacecraft. Microgravity environment is more or less synonymous in its effects, with the recognition that gravitational environments are not uniform and g-forces are never exactly zero.

== Weightlessness in Newtonian mechanics ==
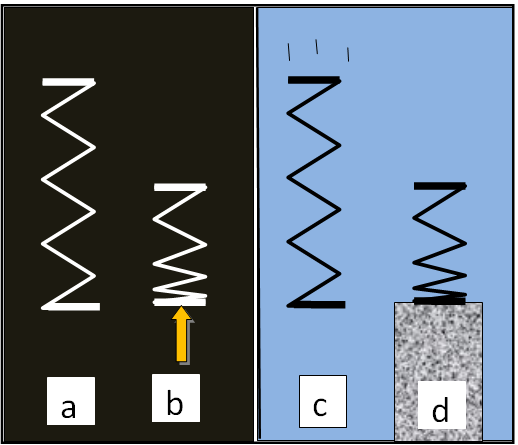
In the left half, the spring is far away from any gravity source. In the right half, it is in a uniform gravitation field.: 1. Zero gravity and weightless; 2. Zero gravity but not weightless (spring is rocket propelled); 3. Spring is in free fall and weightless; 4. Spring rests on a plinth and has both weight_{1} and weight_{2}

In Newtonian physics the sensation of weightlessness experienced by astronauts is not the result of there being zero gravitational acceleration (as seen from the Earth), but of there being no g-force that an astronaut can feel because of the free-fall condition, and also there being zero difference between the acceleration of the spacecraft and the acceleration of the astronaut. Space journalist James Oberg explains the phenomenon this way:

The myth that satellites remain in orbit because they have "escaped Earth's gravity" is perpetuated further (and falsely) by almost universal misuse of the word "zero gravity" to describe the free-falling conditions aboard orbiting space vehicles. Of course, this isn't true; gravity still exists in space. It keeps satellites from flying straight off into interstellar emptiness. What's missing is "weight", the resistance of gravitational attraction by an anchored structure or a counterforce. Satellites stay in space because of their tremendous horizontal speed, which allows them—while being unavoidably pulled toward Earth by gravity—to fall "over the horizon." The ground's curved withdrawal along the Earth's round surface offsets the satellites' fall toward the ground. Speed, not position or lack of gravity, keeps satellites in orbit around the Earth.

From the perspective of an observer not moving with the object (i.e. in an inertial reference frame) the force of gravity on an object in free fall is exactly the same as usual. A classic example is an elevator car where the cable has been cut and it plummets toward Earth, accelerating at a rate equal to the 9.81 meters per second per second. In this scenario, the perception of the gravitational force by someone inside the elevator is mostly, but not entirely, diminished; however the force is not exactly zero. Since gravity is a force directed towards the center of the Earth, two balls a horizontal distance apart would be pulled in slightly different directions and would come closer together as the elevator dropped. Also, if they were some vertical distance apart the lower one would experience a higher gravitational force than the upper one since gravity diminishes according to the inverse square law. These two second-order effects are examples of micro gravity.

== Weightless and reduced weight environments ==
Zero gravity flight maneuver

=== Reduced weight in aircraft ===
Airplanes have been used since 1959 to provide a nearly weightless environment in which to train astronauts, conduct research, and film motion pictures. Such aircraft are commonly referred by the nickname "Vomit Comet".

To create a weightless environment, the airplane flies in a 10 km (6 mi) parabolic arc, first climbing, then entering a powered dive. During the arc, the propulsion and steering of the aircraft are controlled to cancel the drag (air resistance) on the plane out, leaving the plane to behave as if it were free-falling in a vacuum.

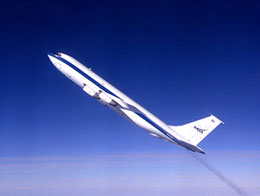
NASA's KC-135A plane ascending for a zero gravity maneuver

==== NASA's Reduced Gravity Aircraft ====
Versions of such airplanes have been operated by NASA's Reduced Gravity Research Program since 1973, where the unofficial nickname originated. NASA later adopted the official nickname 'Weightless Wonder' for publication. NASA's current Reduced Gravity Aircraft, "Weightless Wonder VI", a McDonnell Douglas C-9, is based at Ellington Field (KEFD), near Lyndon B. Johnson Space Center.

NASA's Microgravity University - Reduced Gravity Flight Opportunities Plan, also known as the Reduced Gravity Student Flight Opportunities Program, allows teams of undergraduates to submit a microgravity experiment proposal. If selected, the teams design and implement their experiment, and students are invited to fly on NASA's Vomit Comet.

==== European Space Agency A310 Zero-G ====
The European Space Agency (ESA) flies parabolic flights on a specially modified Airbus A310-300 aircraft to perform research in microgravity. Along with the French CNES and the German DLR, they conduct campaigns of three flights over consecutive days, with each flight's about 30 parabolae totalling about 10 minutes of weightlessness. These campaigns are currently operated from Bordeaux - Mérignac Airport by Novespace, a subsidiary of CNES; the aircraft is flown by test pilots from DGA Essais en Vol.

As of May 2010, the ESA has flown 52 scientific campaigns and also 9 student parabolic flight campaigns. Their first Zero-G flights were in 1984 using a NASA KC-135 aircraft in Houston, Texas. Other aircraft used include the Russian Ilyushin Il-76 MDK before founding Novespace, then a French Caravelle and an Airbus A300 Zero-G.

==== Commercial flights for public passengers ====
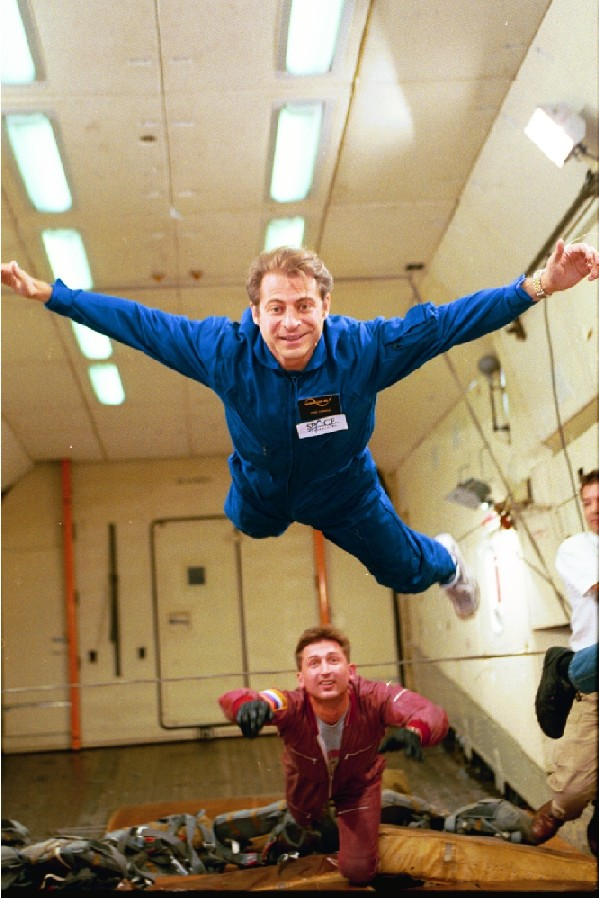
Inside a Russian Ilyushin 76MDK of the Gagarin Cosmonaut Training Center

Novespace created Air Zero G in 2012 to share the experience of weightlessness with 40 public passengers per flight, using the same A310 ZERO-G as for scientific experiences. These flights are sold by Avico, are mainly operated from Bordeaux-Merignac, France, and intend to promote European space research, allowing public passengers to feel weightlessness. Jean-François Clervoy, Chairman of Novespace and ESA astronaut, flies with these one-day astronauts on board A310 Zero-G. After the flight, he explains the quest of space and talks about the 3 space travels he did along his career. The aircraft has also been used for cinema purposes, with Tom Cruise and Annabelle Wallis for the Mummy in 2017.

The Zero Gravity Corporation operates a modified Boeing 727 which flies parabolic arcs to create 25–30 seconds of weightlessness.

=== Ground-based drop facilities ===
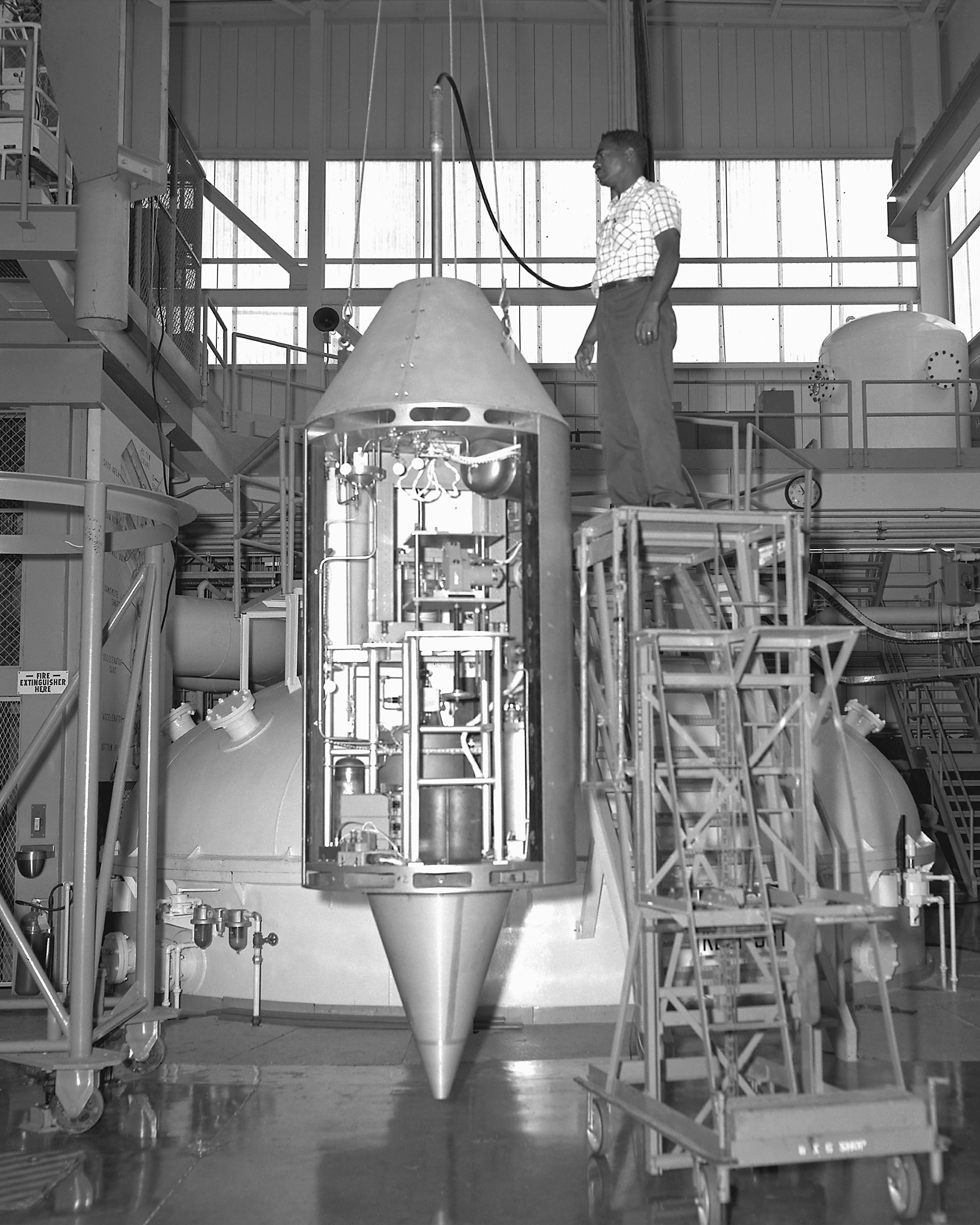
Zero-gravity testing at the NASA Zero Gravity Research Facility

Ground-based facilities that produce weightless conditions for research purposes are typically referred to as drop tubes or drop towers.

NASA's Zero Gravity Research Facility, located at the Glenn Research Center in Cleveland, Ohio, is a 145 m vertical shaft, largely below the ground, with an integral vacuum drop chamber, in which an experiment vehicle can have a free fall for a duration of 5.18 seconds, falling a distance of 132 m. The experiment vehicle is stopped in approximately 4.5 m of pellets of expanded polystyrene, experiencing a peak deceleration rate of 65 g.

Also at NASA Glenn is the 2.2 Second Drop Tower, which has a drop distance of 24.1 m. Experiments are dropped in a drag shield in order to reduce the effects of air drag. The entire package is stopped in a 3.3 m tall air bag, at a peak deceleration rate of approximately 20 g. While the Zero Gravity Facility conducts one or two drops per day, the 2.2 Second Drop Tower can conduct up to twelve drops per day.

NASA's Marshall Space Flight Center hosts another drop tube facility that is 105 m tall and provides a 4.6 s free fall under near-vacuum conditions.

Other drop facilities worldwide include:

- Micro-Gravity Laboratory of Japan (MGLAB) – 4.5 s free fall
- Experimental drop tube of the metallurgy department of Grenoble – 3.1 s free fall
- Fallturm Bremen University of Bremen in Bremen – 4.74 s free fall
- Einstein-Elevator at Leibniz University Hannover – 4.0 s free fall, 4.1 to 9 s for partial-g
- Queensland University of Technology Drop Tower – 2.0 s free fall
- National Centre for Combustion Research and Development at IIT-M – 2.5 s free fall

=== Random Positioning Machines ===
Another ground-based approach to simulate weightlessness for biological samples is a "3D-clinostat", also called a random positioning machine. Unlike a regular clinostat, the random positioning machine rotates in two axes simultaneously and progressively establishes a microgravity-like condition via the principle of gravity-vector-averaging.

=== Neutral buoyancy ===
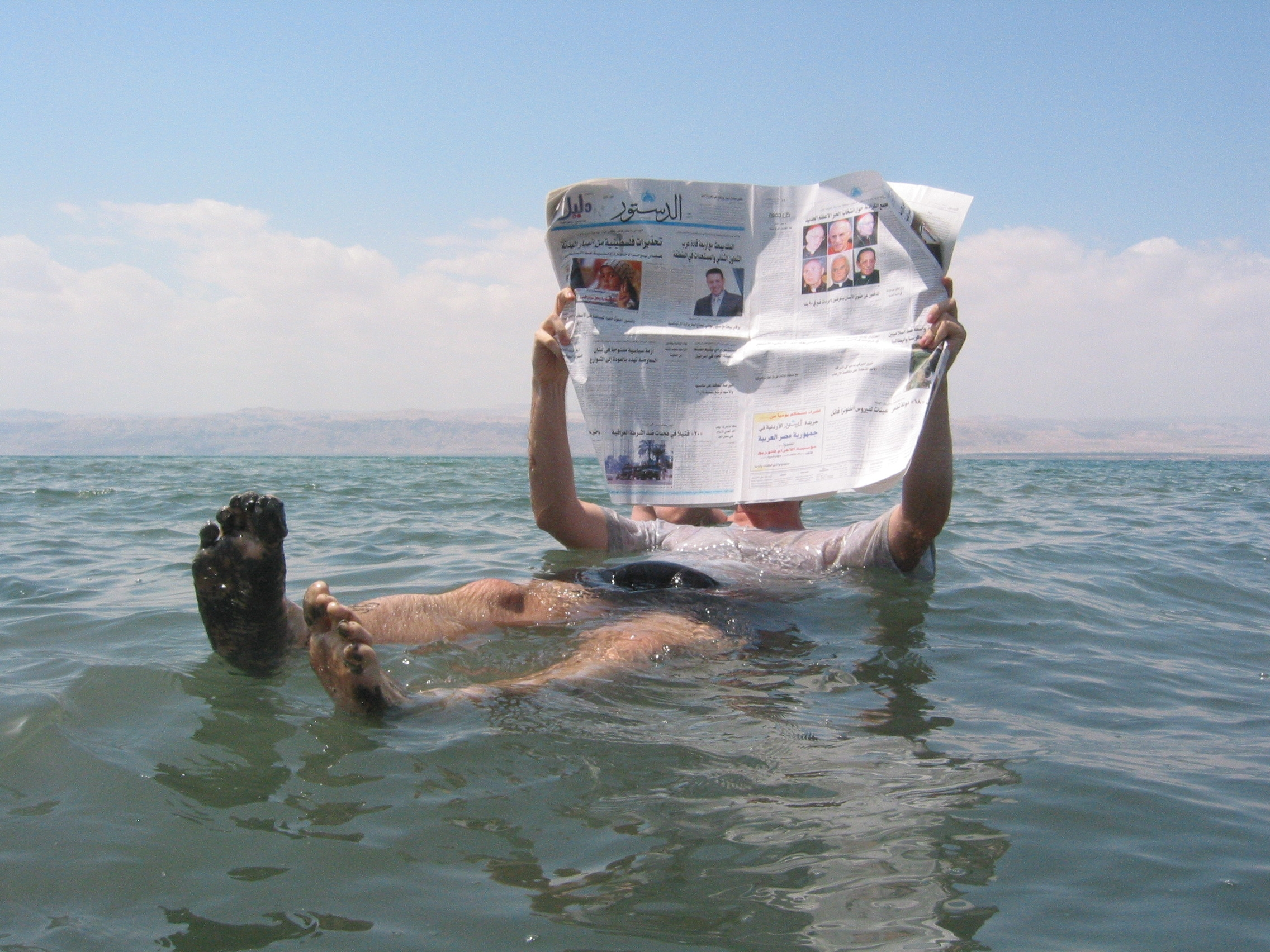
A person floating in the Dead Sea because of its highly saline water, with no need to swim to stay afloat, reading a newspaper in the water is a popular tourist photo setup

==== Neutral buoyancy pool ====
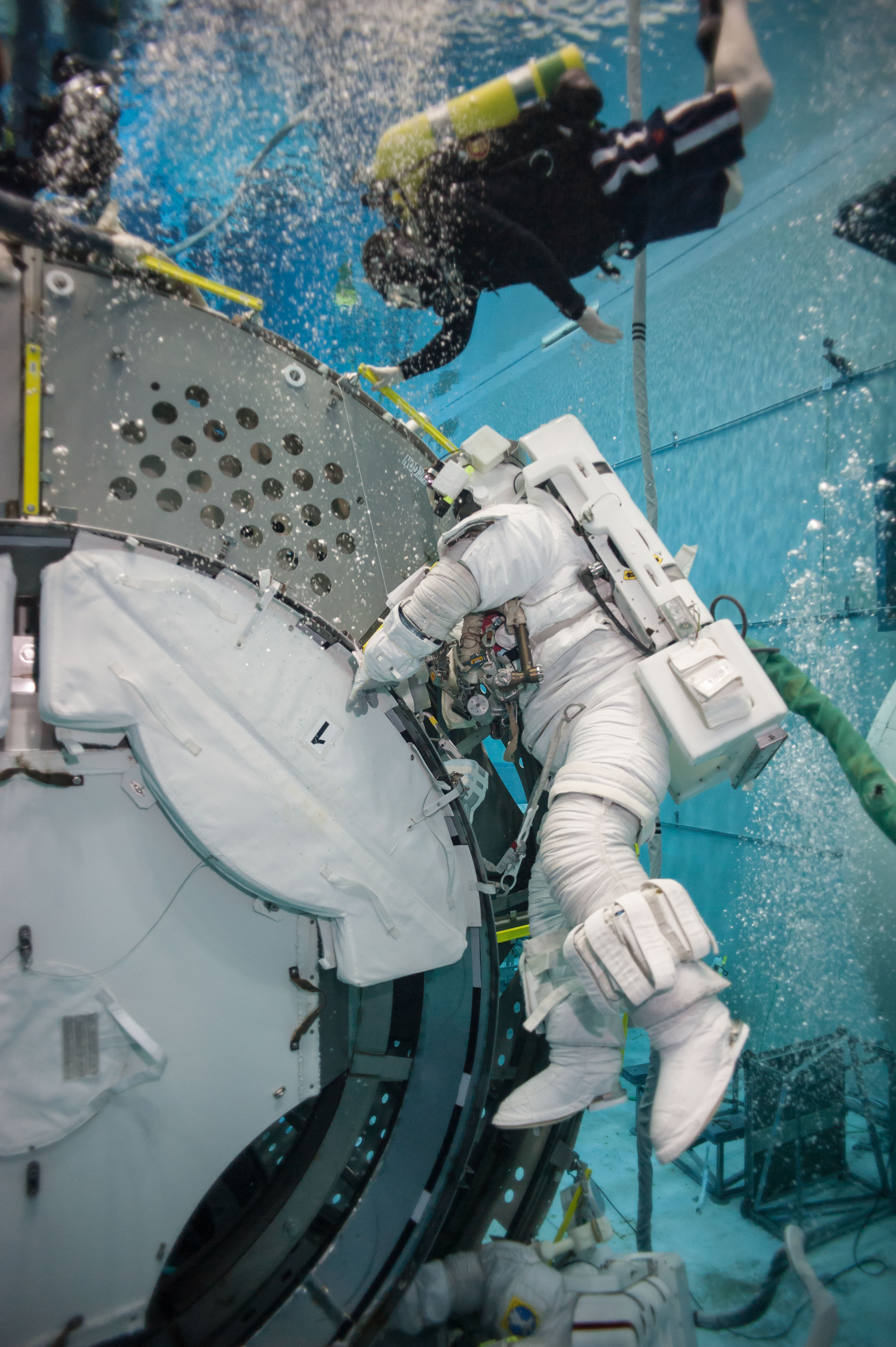
An astronaut training at the Neutral Buoyancy Laboratory in Houston.

A neutral buoyancy pool or neutral buoyancy tank is a pool of water in which neutral buoyancy is used to train astronauts for extravehicular activity and the development of procedures. These pools began to be used in the 1960s and were initially just recreational swimming pools; dedicated facilities would later be built.

=== Orbits ===
The relationship between acceleration and velocity vectors in an orbiting spacecraft

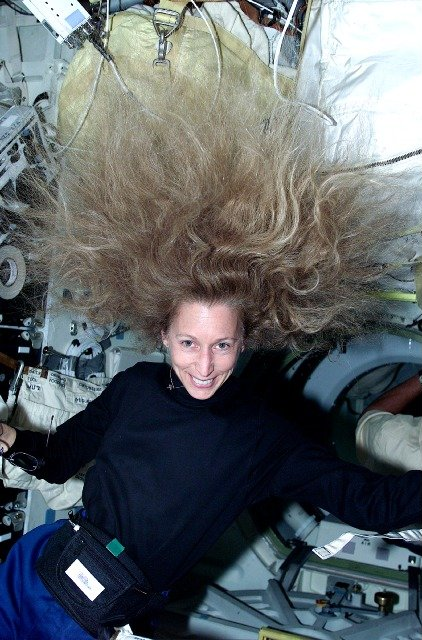
US astronaut Marsha Ivins demonstrates the effect of weightlessness on long hair during STS-98.

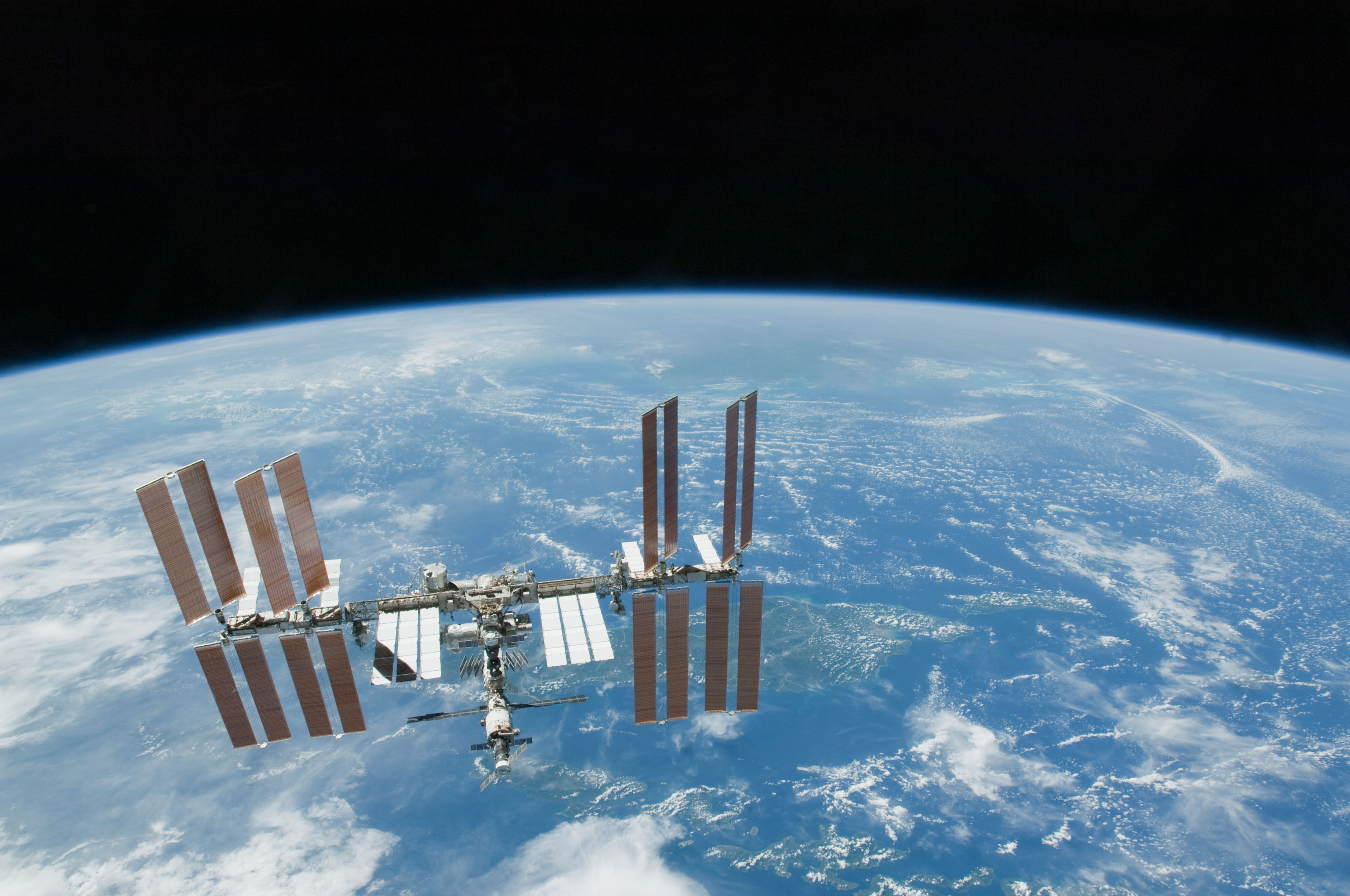
The International Space Station in orbit around Earth, February 2010. The ISS is in a micro-g environment.

On the International Space Station (ISS), there are small g-forces that come from tidal effects, gravity from objects other than the Earth, such as astronauts, the spacecraft, and the Sun, air resistance, and astronaut movements that impart momentum to the space station. The symbol for microgravity, μg, was used on the insignias of Space Shuttle flights STS-87 and STS-107, because these flights were devoted to microgravity research in low Earth orbit.

==== Sub-orbital flights ====
Over the years, biomedical research on the implications of space flight has become more prominent in evaluating possible pathophysiological changes in humans. Sub-orbital flights seize the approximated weightlessness, or μg, in the low Earth orbit and represent a promising research model for short-term exposure. Examples of such approaches are the MASER, MAXUS, or TEXUS program run by the Swedish Space Corporation and the European Space Agency.

==== Orbital motion ====
Orbital motion is a form of free fall. Objects in orbit are not perfectly weightless due to several effects:

- Effects depending on relative position in the spacecraft:
  - Because the force of gravity decreases with distance, objects with non-zero size will be subjected to a tidal force, or a differential pull, between the ends of the object nearest and furthest from the Earth. (An extreme version of this effect is spaghettification.) In a spacecraft in low Earth orbit (LEO), the centrifugal force is also greater on the side of the spacecraft furthest from the Earth. At a 400 km LEO altitude, the overall differential in g-force is approximately 0.384 μg/m.
  - Gravity between the spacecraft and an object within it may make the object slowly "fall" toward a more massive part of it. The acceleration is 0.007 μg for 1000 kg at 1 m distance.
- Uniform effects (which could be compensated):
  - Though extremely thin, there is some air at orbital altitudes of 185 to 1,000 km. This atmosphere causes minuscule deceleration due to friction. This could be compensated by a small continuous thrust, but in practice the deceleration is only compensated from time to time, so the tiny g-force of this effect is not eliminated.
  - The effects of the solar wind and radiation pressure are similar, but directed away from the Sun. Unlike the effect of the atmosphere, it does not reduce with altitude.
- Other Effects:
  - Routine crew activity: Due to the conservation of momentum, any crew member aboard a spacecraft pushing off a wall causes the spacecraft to move in the opposite direction.
  - Structural Vibration: Stress enacted on the hull of the spacecraft results in the spacecraft bending, causing apparent acceleration.

=== Weightlessness at the center of a planet ===
If an object were to travel to the center of a spherical planet unimpeded by the planet's materials, it would achieve a state of weightlessness upon arriving at the center of the planet's core. This is because the mass of the surrounding planet is exerting an equal gravitational pull in all directions from the center, canceling out the pull of any one direction, establishing a space with no gravitational pull.

== Absence of gravity ==
A "stationary" micro-g environment would require travelling far enough into deep space so as to reduce the effect of gravity by attenuation to almost zero. This is simple in conception but requires travelling a very large distance, rendering it highly impractical. For example, to reduce the gravity of the Earth by a factor of one million, one needs to be at a distance of 6 million kilometres from the Earth, but to reduce the gravity of the Sun to this amount, one has to be at a distance of 3.7 billion kilometres. This is not impossible, but it has only been achieved thus far by four interstellar probes: (Voyager 1 and 2 of the Voyager program, and Pioneer 10 and 11 of the Pioneer program.) At the speed of light it would take roughly three and a half hours to reach this micro-gravity environment (a region of space where the acceleration due to gravity is one-millionth of that experienced on the Earth's surface). To reduce the gravity to one-thousandth of that on Earth's surface, however, one needs only to be at a distance of 200,000 km.

Location	Gravity due to			Total
Location	Earth	Sun	rest of Milky Way	Total
Earth's surface	9.81 m/s^{2}	6 mm/s^{2}	200 pm/s^{2} = 6 mm/s/yr	9.81 m/s^{2}
Low Earth orbit	9 m/s^{2}	6 mm/s^{2}	200 pm/s^{2}	9 m/s^{2}
200,000 km from Earth	10 mm/s^{2}	6 mm/s^{2}	200 pm/s^{2}	up to 12 mm/s^{2}
6×10^{6} km from Earth	10 μm/s^{2}	6 mm/s^{2}	200 pm/s^{2}	6 mm/s^{2}
3.7×10^{9} km from Earth	29 pm/s^{2}	10 μm/s^{2}	200 pm/s^{2}	10 μm/s^{2}
Voyager 1 (17×10^{9} km from Earth)	1 pm/s^{2}	500 nm/s^{2}	200 pm/s^{2}	500 nm/s^{2}
0.1 light-year from Earth	400 am/s^{2}	200 pm/s^{2}	200 pm/s^{2}	up to 400 pm/s^{2}

At a distance relatively close to Earth (less than 3000 km), gravity is only slightly reduced. As an object orbits a body such as the Earth, gravity is still attracting objects towards the Earth and the object is accelerated downward at almost 1g. Because the objects are typically moving laterally with respect to the surface at such immense speeds, the object will not lose altitude because of the curvature of the Earth. When viewed from an orbiting observer, other close objects in space appear to be floating because everything is being pulled towards Earth at the same speed, but also moving forward as the Earth's surface "falls" away below. All these objects are in free fall, not zero gravity.

Compare the gravitational potential at some of these locations.

== Health effects ==
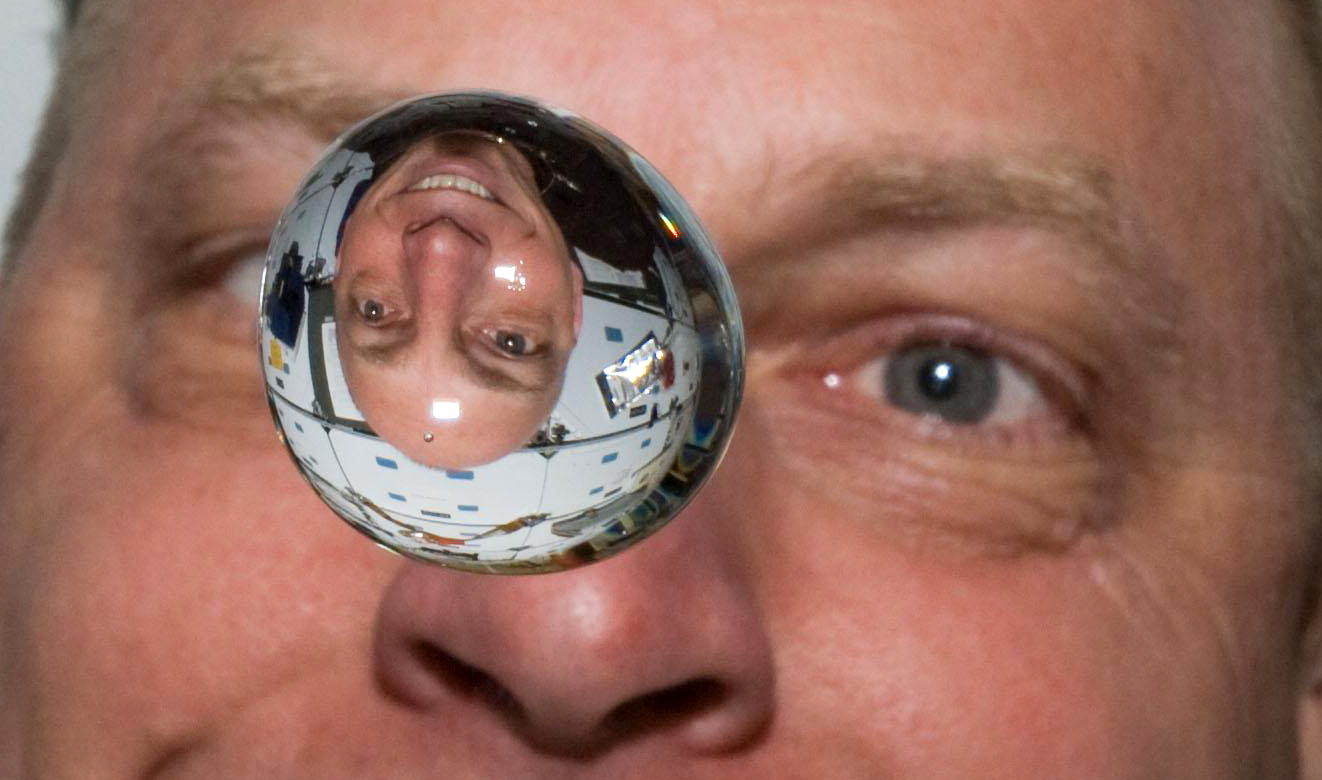
Astronaut Clayton Anderson as a large drop of water floats in front of him on the Discovery. Cohesion plays a bigger role in space.

Following the advent of space stations that can be inhabited for long periods, exposure to weightlessness has been demonstrated to have some deleterious effects on human health. Humans are well-adapted to the physical conditions at the surface of the Earth. In response to an extended period of weightlessness, various physiological systems begin to change and atrophy. Though these changes are usually temporary, long-term health issues can result.

The most common problem experienced by humans in the initial hours of weightlessness is known as space adaptation syndrome (SAS), commonly referred to as space sickness. Symptoms of SAS include nausea and vomiting, vertigo, headaches, lethargy, and overall malaise. The first case of SAS was reported by cosmonaut Gherman Titov in 1961. Since then, roughly 45% of all people who have flown in space have suffered from this condition. The duration of space sickness varies, but in no case has it lasted for more than 72 hours, after which the body adjusts to the new environment. NASA jokingly measures SAS using the "Garn scale", named for United States Senator Jake Garn, whose SAS during STS-51-D was the worst on record. Accordingly, one "Garn" is equivalent to the most severe possible case of SAS.

The most significant adverse effects of long-term weightlessness are muscle atrophy (see Reduced muscle mass, strength and performance in space for more information) and deterioration of the skeleton, or spaceflight osteopenia. These effects can be minimized through a regimen of exercise, such as cycling for example. Astronauts subject to long periods of weightlessness wear pants with elastic bands attached between waistband and cuffs to compress the leg bones and reduce osteopenia. Other significant effects include fluid redistribution (causing the "moon-face" appearance typical of pictures of astronauts in weightlessness), changes in the cardiovascular system as blood pressures and flow velocities change in response to a lack of gravity, a decreased production of red blood cells, balance disorders, and a weakening of the immune system. Lesser symptoms include loss of body mass, nasal congestion, sleep disturbance, excess flatulence, and puffiness of the face. These effects begin to reverse quickly upon return to the Earth.

In addition, after long space flight missions, astronauts may experience vision changes. Such eyesight problems may be a major concern for future deep space flight missions, including a crewed mission to the planet Mars. Exposure to high levels of radiation may influence the development of atherosclerosis. Clots in the internal jugular vein have recently been detected inflight.

On December 31, 2012, a NASA-supported study reported that human spaceflight may harm the brains of astronauts and accelerate the onset of Alzheimer's disease. In October 2015, the NASA Office of Inspector General issued a health hazards report related to human spaceflight, including a human mission to Mars.

=== Space motion sickness ===
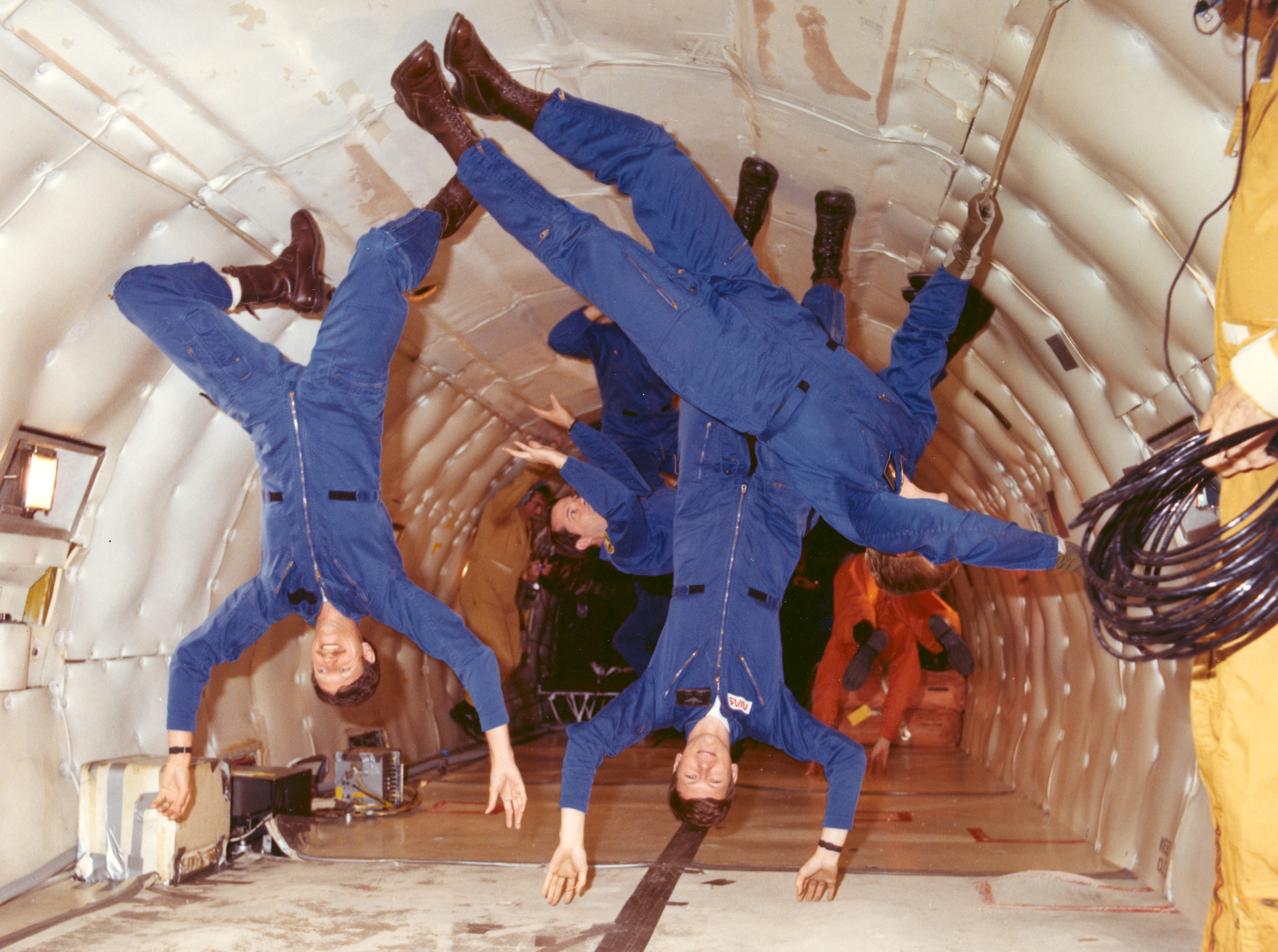
Six astronauts who had been in training at the Johnson Space Center for almost a year are getting a sample of a micro-g environment.

Space motion sickness (SMS) is thought to be a subtype of motion sickness that plagues nearly half of all astronauts who venture into space. SMS, along with facial stuffiness from headward shifts of fluids, headaches, and back pain, is part of a broader complex of symptoms that comprise space adaptation syndrome (SAS). SMS was first described in 1961 during the second orbit of the fourth crewed spaceflight when the cosmonaut Gherman Titov aboard the Vostok 2, described feeling disoriented with physical complaints mostly consistent with motion sickness. It is one of the most studied physiological problems of spaceflight but continues to pose a significant difficulty for many astronauts. In some instances, it can be so debilitating that astronauts must sit out from their scheduled occupational duties in space – including missing out on a spacewalk they have spent months training to perform. In most cases, however, astronauts will work through the symptoms even with degradation in their performance.

Despite their experiences in some of the most rigorous and demanding physical maneuvers on earth, even the most seasoned astronauts may be affected by SMS, resulting in symptoms of severe nausea, projectile vomiting, fatigue, malaise (feeling sick), and headache. These symptoms may occur so abruptly and without any warning that space travelers may vomit suddenly without time to contain the emesis, resulting in strong odors and liquid within the cabin which may affect other astronauts. Some changes to eye movement behaviors might also occur as a result of SMS. Symptoms typically last anywhere from one to three days upon entering weightlessness, but may recur upon reentry to Earth's gravity or even shortly after landing. SMS differs from terrestrial motion sickness in that sweating and pallor are typically minimal or absent and gastrointestinal findings usually demonstrate absent bowel sounds indicating reduced gastrointestinal motility.

Even when the nausea and vomiting resolve, some central nervous system symptoms may persist which may degrade the astronaut's performance. Graybiel and Knepton proposed the term "sopite syndrome" to describe symptoms of lethargy and drowsiness associated with motion sickness in 1976. Since then, their definition has been revised to include "...a symptom complex that develops as a result of exposure to real or apparent motion and is characterized by excessive drowsiness, lassitude, lethargy, mild depression, and reduced ability to focus on an assigned task." Together, these symptoms may pose a substantial threat (albeit temporary) to the astronaut who must remain attentive to life-and-death issues at all times.

SMS is most commonly thought to be a disorder of the vestibular system that occurs when sensory information from the visual system (sight) and the proprioceptive system (posture, position of the body) conflicts with misperceived information from the semicircular canals and the otoliths within the inner ear. This is known as the 'neural mismatch theory' and was first suggested in 1975 by Reason and Brand. Alternatively, the fluid shift hypothesis suggests that weightlessness reduces the hydrostatic pressure on the lower body causing fluids to shift toward the head from the rest of the body. These fluid shifts are thought to increase cerebrospinal fluid pressure (causing backaches), intracranial pressure (causing headaches), and inner ear fluid pressure (causing vestibular dysfunction).

Despite a multitude of studies searching for a solution to the problem of SMS, it remains an ongoing problem for space travel. Most non-pharmacological countermeasures such as training and other physical maneuvers have offered minimal benefit. Thornton and Bonato noted, "Pre- and inflight adaptive efforts, some of them mandatory and most of them onerous, have been, for the most part, operational failures." To date, the most common intervention is promethazine, an injectable antihistamine with antiemetic properties, but sedation can be a problematic side effect. Other common pharmacological options include metoclopramide, as well as oral and transdermal application of scopolamine, but drowsiness and sedation are common side effects for these medications as well.

=== Musculoskeletal effects ===
In the space (or microgravity) environment the effects of unloading varies significantly among individuals, with sex differences compounding the variability. Differences in mission duration, and the small sample size of astronauts participating in the same mission also adds to the variability to the musculoskeletal disorders that are seen in space. In addition to muscle loss, microgravity leads to increased bone resorption, decreased bone mineral density, and increased fracture risks. Bone resorption leads to increased urinary levels of calcium, which can subsequently lead to an increased risk of nephrolithiasis.

In the first two weeks that the muscles are unloaded from carrying the weight of the human frame during space flight, whole muscle atrophy begins. Postural muscles contain more slow fibers, and are more prone to atrophy than non-postural muscle groups. The loss of muscle mass occurs because of imbalances in protein synthesis and breakdown. The loss of muscle mass is also accompanied by a loss of muscle strength, which was observed after only 2–5 days of spaceflight during the Soyuz-3 and Soyuz-8 missions. Decreases in the generation of contractile forces and whole muscle power have also been found in response to microgravity.

To counter the effects of microgravity on the musculoskeletal system, aerobic exercise is recommended. This often takes the form of in-flight cycling. A more effective regimen includes resistive exercises or the use of a penguin suit (contains sewn-in elastic bands to maintain a stretch load on antigravity muscles), centrifugation, and vibration. Centrifugation recreates Earth's gravitational force on the space station, in order to prevent muscle atrophy. Centrifugation can be performed with centrifuges or by cycling along the inner wall of the space station. Whole body vibration has been found to reduce bone resorption through mechanisms that are unclear. Vibration can be delivered using exercise devices that use vertical displacements juxtaposed to a fulcrum, or by using a plate that oscillates on a vertical axis. The use of beta-2 adrenergic agonists to increase muscle mass, and the use of essential amino acids in conjunction with resistive exercises have been proposed as pharmacologic means of combating muscle atrophy in space.

=== Cardiovascular effects ===
Astronaut Tracy Dyson talks about studies into cardiovascular health aboard the International Space Station.

Next to the skeletal and muscular system, the cardiovascular system is less strained in weightlessness than on Earth and is de-conditioned during longer periods spent in space. In a regular environment, gravity exerts a downward force, setting up a vertical hydrostatic gradient. When standing, some 'excess' fluid resides in vessels and tissues of the legs. In a micro-g environment, with the loss of a hydrostatic gradient, some fluid quickly redistributes toward the chest and upper body, and may be moot sensed as 'overload' of circulating blood volume. In the micro-g environment, the newly sensed excess blood volume is adjusted by expelling excess fluid into tissues and cells (12-15% volume reduction) and red blood cells are adjusted downward to maintain a normal concentration (relative anemia). In the absence of gravity, venous blood will rush to the right atrium because the force of gravity is no longer pulling the blood down into the vessels of the legs and abdomen, resulting in increased stroke volume. These fluid shifts become more dangerous upon returning to a regular-gravity environment, as the body will attempt to adapt to the reintroduction of gravity. The reintroduction of gravity again will pull the fluid downward, but now there would be a deficit in both circulating fluid and red blood cells. The decrease in cardiac filling pressure and stroke volume during the orthostatic stress due to a decreased blood volume is what causes orthostatic intolerance. Orthostatic intolerance can result in temporary loss of consciousness and posture, due to the lack of pressure and stroke volume. Some animal species have evolved physiological and anatomical features (such as high hydrostatic blood pressure and closer heart place to head) which enable them to counteract orthostatic blood pressure. More chronic orthostatic intolerance can result in additional symptoms such as nausea, sleep problems, and other vasomotor symptoms as well.

Many studies on the physiological effects of weightlessness on the cardiovascular system are done in parabolic flights. It is one of the only feasible options to combine with human experiments, making parabolic flights the only way to investigate the true effects of the micro-g environment on a body without traveling into space. Parabolic flight studies have provided a broad range of results regarding changes in the cardiovascular system in a micro-g environment. Parabolic flight studies have increased the understanding of orthostatic intolerance and decreased peripheral blood flow suffered by astronauts returning to Earth. Due to the loss of blood to pump, the heart can atrophy in a micro-g environment. A weakened heart can result in low blood volume, low blood pressure and affect the body's ability to send oxygen to the brain without the individual becoming dizzy. Heart rhythm disturbances have also been seen among astronauts, but it is unclear whether this was a result of pre-existing conditions or an effect of the micro-g environment. One current countermeasure includes drinking a salt solution, which increases the viscosity of blood and subsequently increases blood pressure, which mitigates post-micro-g-environment orthostatic intolerance. Another countermeasure includes administration of midodrine, which is a selective alpha-1 adrenergic agonist. Midodrine produces arterial and venous constriction resulting in an increase in blood pressure by baroreceptor reflexes.

=== Effects on non-human organisms ===
Russian scientists have observed differences between cockroaches conceived in space and their terrestrial counterparts. The space-conceived cockroaches grew more quickly, and also grew up to be faster and tougher.

Chicken eggs that are put in microgravity two days after fertilization appear not to develop properly, whereas eggs put in microgravity more than a week after fertilization develop normally.

A 2006 Space Shuttle experiment found that Salmonella typhimurium, a bacterium that can cause food poisoning, became more virulent when cultivated in space. On April 29, 2013, scientists in Rensselaer Polytechnic Institute, funded by NASA, reported that, during spaceflight on the International Space Station, microbes seem to adapt to the space environment in ways "not observed on Earth" and in ways that "can lead to increases in growth and virulence".

Under certain test conditions, microbes have been observed to thrive in the near-weightlessness of space and to survive in the vacuum of outer space.

== Commercial applications ==
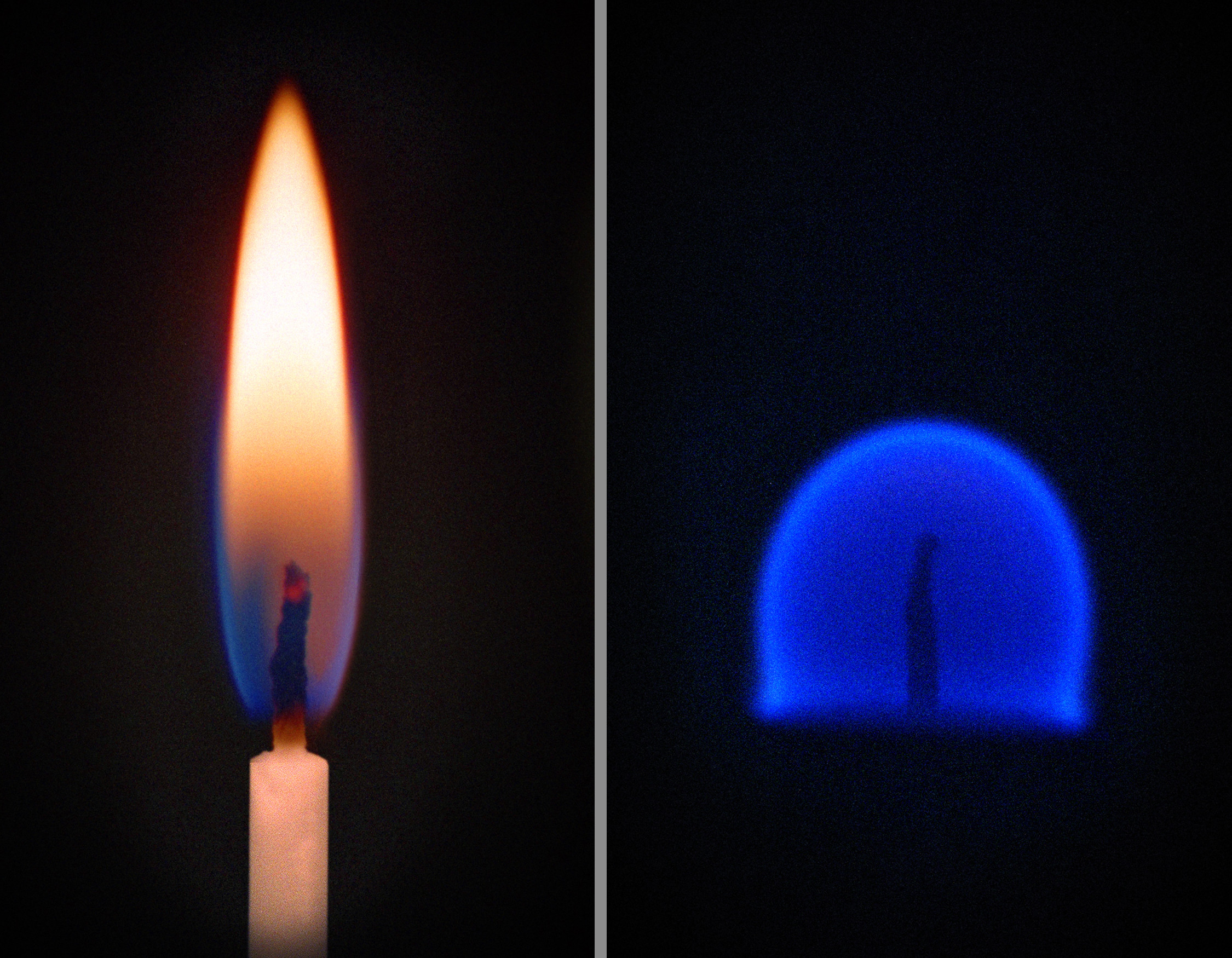
Candle flame on Earth (left) versus in orbital conditions (right)

=== High-quality crystals ===
While not yet a commercial application, there has been interest in growing crystals in micro-g, as in a space station or automated artificial satellite through low-gravity process engineering, in an attempt to reduce crystal lattice defects. Such defect-free crystals may prove useful for certain microelectronic applications and also to produce crystals for subsequent X-ray crystallography.

In 2017, an experiment on the ISS was conducted to crystallize the monoclonal antibody therapeutic pembrolizumab, where results showed more uniform and homogenous crystal particles compared to ground controls. Such uniform crystal particles can allow for the formulation of more concentrated, low-volume antibody therapies potentially suitable for subcutaneous administration, a less invasive approach compared to the current prevalent method of intravenous administration.

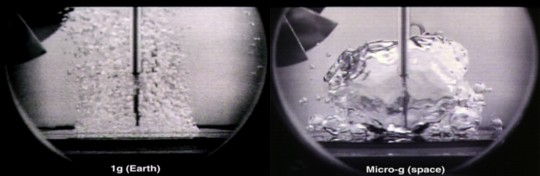
Comparison of boiling of water under Earth's gravity (1 g, left) and microgravity (right). The source of heat is in the lower part of the photograph.

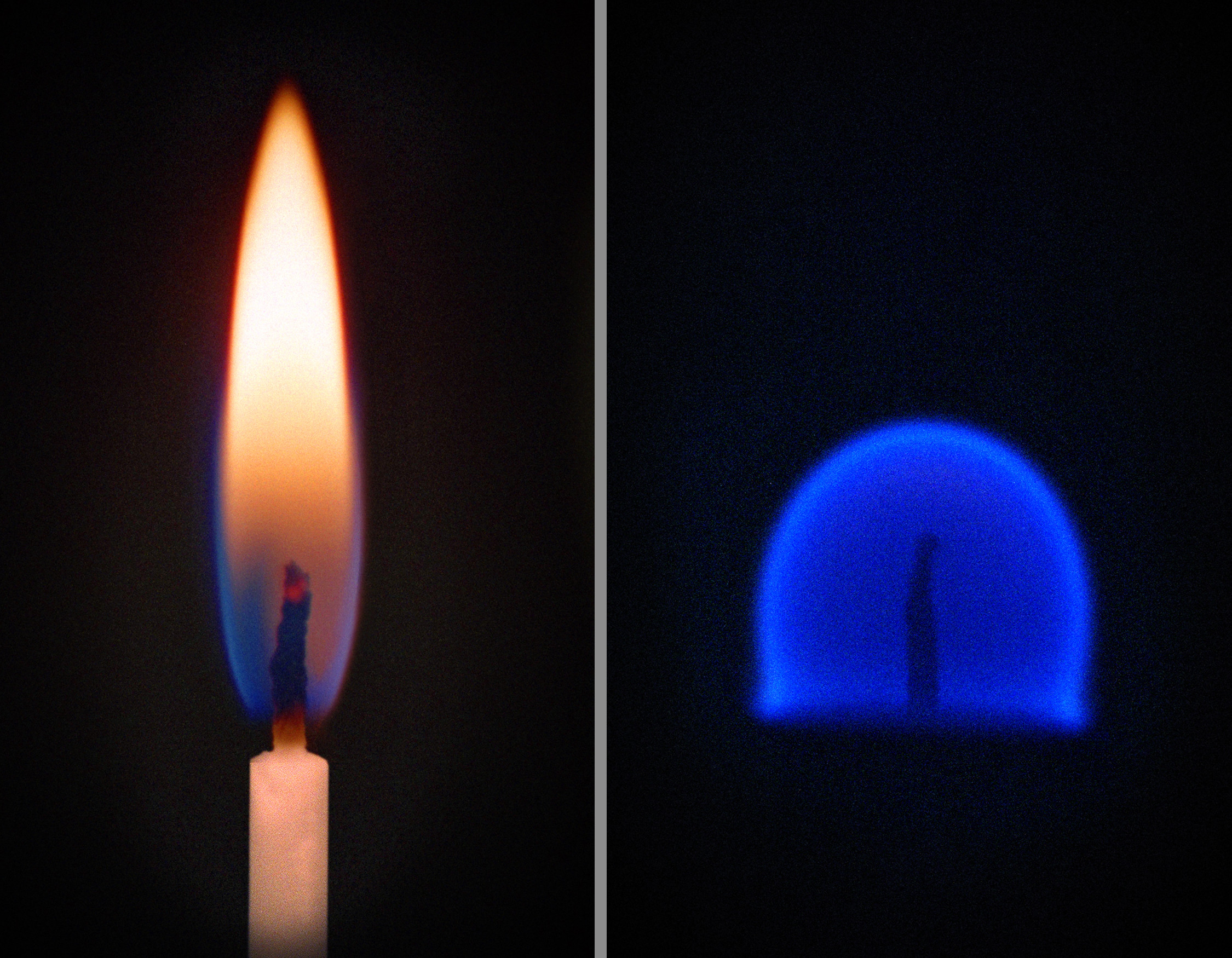
A comparison between the combustion of a candle on Earth (left) and in a microgravity environment, such as that found on the ISS (right)

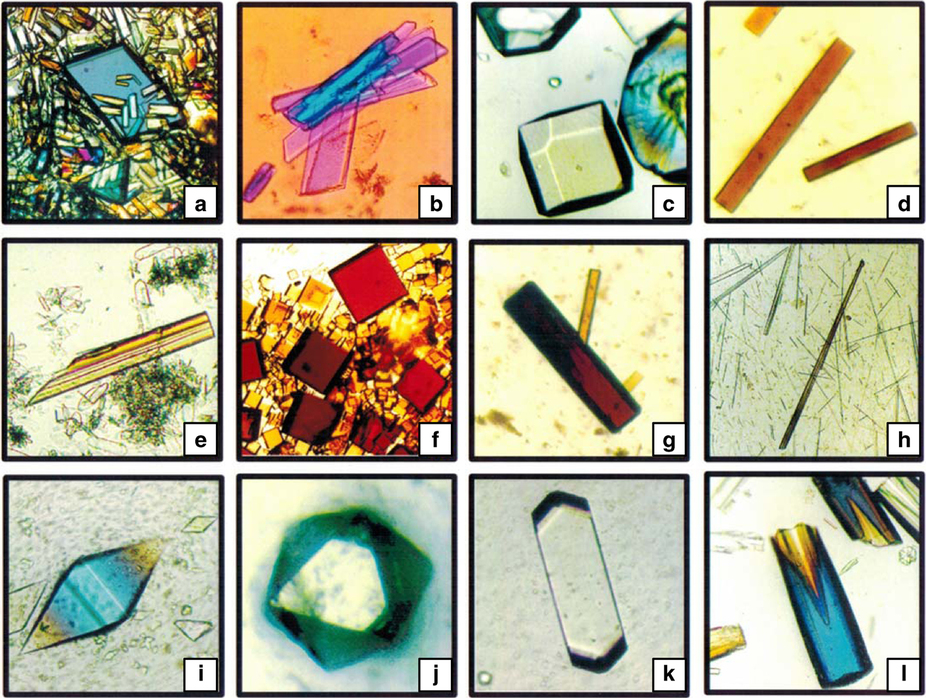
Protein crystals grown by American scientists on the Russian space station Mir in 1995

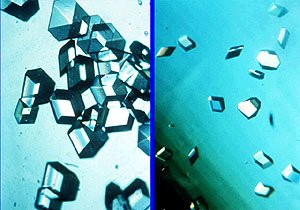
Comparison of insulin crystals growth in outer space (left) and on Earth (right)

Liquids may also behave differently than on Earth, as demonstrated in this video.

== History ==
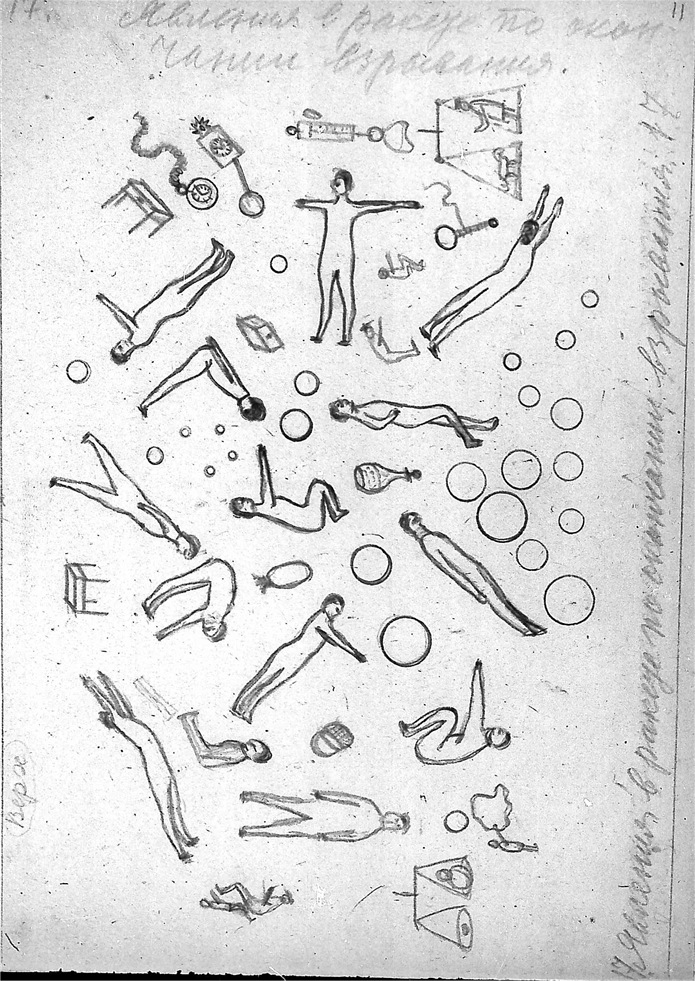
A drawing of people and things floating in orbit by Konstantin Tsiolkovsky, an early space scientist (1933)

Isaac Newton described in the 17th century the necessary understanding to explain weightlessness.

Konstantin Tsiolkovsky described orbital weightlessness.

In the 1950s the brothers Fritz Haber and Heinz Haber proposed using parabolic flights to simulate weightlessness.

== See also ==
- Artificial gravity
- Astronauts
  - Astronaut training
  - Commercial astronauts
- Clinostat
- ESA Scientific Research on the International Space Station
- European Low Gravity Research Association (ELGRA)
- G-jitter
- Microgravity University
- Reduced-gravity aircraft
- Scientific research on the International Space Station
- Space manufacturing
- Space medicine
- Vomit Comet
