= Low-gravity process engineering =

Space manufacturing and fluid behavior

Low-gravity process engineering is a specialized field that focuses on the design, development, and optimization of industrial processes and manufacturing techniques in environments with reduced gravitational forces. This discipline encompasses a wide range of applications, from microgravity conditions experienced in Earth orbit to the partial gravity environments found on celestial bodies such as the Moon and Mars.

As humanity reaches beyond Earth, the ability to effectively produce materials, manage fluids, and conduct chemical processes in reduced gravity becomes important for prolonged space missions and potential colonization efforts. Furthermore, the unique conditions of microgravity offer opportunities for new materials and pharmaceuticals that cannot be easily produced on Earth, which could lead to advancements in various industries.

The historical context of low-gravity research dates back to the early days of space exploration. Initial experiments conducted during the Mercury and Gemini programs in the 1960s provided the first insights into fluid behavior in microgravity. Subsequent missions, including Skylab and the Space Shuttle program, expanded our understanding of materials processing and fluid dynamics in space. The advent of the International Space Station (ISS) in the late 1990s marked a significant milestone, providing a permanent microgravity laboratory for continuous research and development in low-gravity process engineering.

== Fundamentals of low-gravity environments ==
Low-gravity environments, encompassing both microgravity and reduced gravity conditions, exhibit unique characteristics that significantly alter physical phenomena compared to Earth's gravitational field. These environments are typically characterized by gravitational accelerations ranging from $10^{-6}$$g$ to $10^{-2}$$g$, where $g$ represents Earth's standard gravitational acceleration $(9.81 m/s^2)$.

Microgravity, often experienced in orbiting spacecraft, is characterized by the near absence of perceptible weight. In contrast, reduced gravity conditions, such as those on the Moon ($0.16g$) or Mars ($0.37g$), maintain a fractional gravitational pull relative to Earth.

These environments differ markedly from Earth's gravity in several key aspects:

1. Absence of natural convection: On Earth, density differences in fluids due to temperature gradients drive natural convection. In microgravity, this effect is negligible, leading to diffusion-dominated heat and mass transfer.
2. Surface tension dominance: Without the overwhelming force of gravity, surface tension becomes a dominant force in fluid behavior, significantly affecting liquid spreading and containment.
3. Particle suspension: In low-gravity environments, particles in fluids remain suspended for extended periods, as sedimentation and buoyancy effects are minimal.

=== Effects of low-gravity conditions on various physical processes ===
==== Fluid dynamics ====
In microgravity, fluid behavior is primarily governed by surface tension, viscous forces, and inertia. This leads to phenomena such as large stable liquid bridges, spherical droplet formation, and capillary flow dominance. The absence of buoyancy-driven convection alters mixing processes and phase separations, necessitating alternative methods for fluid management in space applications.

==== Heat transfer ====
The lack of natural convection in microgravity significantly impacts heat transfer processes. Conduction and radiation become the primary modes of heat transfer, while forced convection must be induced artificially. This alteration affects cooling systems, boiling processes, and thermal management in spacecraft and space-based manufacturing.

==== Material behavior ====
Low-gravity environments offer unique conditions for materials processing. The absence of buoyancy-driven convection and sedimentation allows for more uniform crystal growth and the formation of novel alloys and composites. Additionally, the reduced mechanical stresses in microgravity can lead to changes in material properties and behavior, influencing fields such as materials science and pharmaceutical research.

== Challenges ==
Low-gravity process engineering faces a number of challenges that require innovative solutions and adaptations of terrestrial technologies. These challenges stem from the unique physical phenomena observed in microgravity and reduced gravity environments.

=== Fluid management issues ===
The absence of buoyancy and the dominance of surface tension in low-gravity environments significantly alter fluid behavior, presenting several challenges:

1. Liquid-gas separation: Without buoyancy, separating liquids and gases becomes difficult, affecting processes such as fuel management and life support systems.
2. Capillary effects: Surface tension dominance leads to unexpected fluid migrations and containment issues, requiring specialized designs for fluid handling systems.
3. Bubble formation and coalescence: In microgravity, bubbles tend to persist and coalesce more readily, potentially disrupting fluid processes and heat transfer mechanisms.

=== Heat transfer limitations ===
The lack of natural convection in low-gravity environments poses significant challenges for heat transfer processes:

1. Reduced convective heat transfer: Without buoyancy-driven flows, heat transfer becomes primarily dependent on conduction and radiation, potentially leading to localized hot spots and thermal management issues.
2. Boiling and condensation: These phase change processes behave differently in microgravity, affecting cooling systems and thermal management strategies.
3. Temperature gradients: The absence of natural mixing can result in sharp temperature gradients, impacting reaction kinetics and material processing.

=== Material handling and containment difficulties ===
Low-gravity environments present unique challenges in manipulating and containing materials:

1. Particle behavior: Without settling due to gravity, particles tend to remain suspended and disperse differently, affecting filtration, separation, and mixing processes.
2. Liquid containment: Surface tension effects can cause liquids to adhere unexpectedly to container walls, complicating storage and transfer operations.
3. Phase separation: The lack of density-driven separation makes it challenging to separate immiscible fluids or different phases of materials.

=== Equipment design considerations ===
Designing equipment for low-gravity operations requires addressing several unique factors

1. Mass and volume constraints: Space missions have strict limitations on payload mass and volume, necessitating compact and lightweight designs.
2. Automation and remote operation: Many processes must be designed for autonomous or remote operation due to limited human presence in space environments.
3. Reliability and redundancy: The inaccessibility of space environments demands highly reliable systems with built-in redundancies to mitigate potential failures.
4. Microgravity-specific mechanisms: Equipment must often incorporate novel mechanisms to replace gravity-dependent functions, such as pumps for fluid transport or centrifuges for separation processes.
5. Multi-functionality: Due to resource constraints, equipment is often designed to serve multiple purposes, increasing complexity but reducing overall payload requirements.

Addressing these challenges requires interdisciplinary approaches, combining insights from fluid dynamics, heat transfer, materials science, and aerospace engineering. As research in low-gravity process engineering progresses, new solutions and technologies continue to emerge, expanding the possibilities for space-based manufacturing and resource utilization.

== Key areas ==
=== Fluid processing ===
Multiphase flow behavior in microgravity differs substantially from terrestrial conditions. The absence of buoyancy-driven phase separation leads to complex flow patterns and phase distributions. These phenomena affect heat transfer, mass transport, and chemical reactions in multiphase systems, necessitating novel approaches to fluid management in space.

Boiling and condensation processes are fundamentally altered in microgravity. The lack of buoyancy affects bubble dynamics, heat transfer coefficients, and critical heat flux. Understanding these changes is crucial for designing efficient thermal management systems for spacecraft and space habitats.

Capillary flow and wetting phenomena become dominant in low-gravity environments. Surface tension forces drive fluid behavior, leading to unexpected liquid migrations and containment challenges. These effects are particularly important in the design of fuel tanks, life support systems, and fluid handling equipment for space applications.

=== Materials processing ===
Materials processing in space provides multiple challenges to conventional techniques as well as allowing for more unconventional procedures that wouldn't work in high-gravity.

Crystal growth in space benefits from the absence of gravity-induced convection and sedimentation. This environment allows for the growth of larger, more perfect crystals with fewer defects. Space-grown crystals have applications in electronics, optics, and pharmaceutical research.

Metallurgy and alloy formation in microgravity can result in materials with unique properties. The absence of buoyancy-driven convection allows for more uniform mixing of molten metals and the creation of novel alloys and composites that are difficult or impossible to produce on Earth.

Additive manufacturing in low-gravity environments presents both challenges and opportunities. While the absence of gravity can affect material deposition and layer adhesion, it also allows for the creation of complex structures without the need for support materials. This technology has potential applications in on-demand manufacturing of spare parts and tools for long-duration space missions.

=== Biotechnology applications ===
Microgravity conditions offer unique advantages for various biotechnology applications.

Protein crystallization in space often results in larger, more well-ordered crystals compared to those grown on Earth. These high-quality crystals are valuable for structural biology studies and drug design. The microgravity environment reduces sedimentation and convection, allowing for more uniform crystal growth.

Cell culturing and tissue engineering benefit from the reduced mechanical stresses in microgravity. This environment allows for three-dimensional cell growth and the formation of tissue-like structures that more closely resemble in vivo conditions. Such studies contribute to our understanding of cellular biology and may lead to advancements in regenerative medicine.

Pharmaceutical production in space has the potential to yield purer drugs with improved efficacy. The absence of convection and sedimentation can lead to more uniform crystallization and particle formation, potentially enhancing drug properties.

=== Chemical engineering processes ===
Chemical engineering processes in microgravity often exhibit different behaviors compared to their terrestrial counterparts.

Reaction kinetics in microgravity can be altered due to the absence of buoyancy-driven convection. This can lead to more uniform reaction conditions and potentially different reaction rates or product distributions.

Separation processes, such as distillation and extraction, face unique challenges in low-gravity environments. The lack of buoyancy affects phase separation and mass transfer, requiring novel approaches to achieve efficient separations. These challenges have led to the development of alternative separation technologies for space applications.

Catalysis in space presents opportunities for studying fundamental catalytic processes without the interfering effects of gravity. The absence of natural convection and sedimentation can lead to more uniform catalyst distributions and potentially different reaction pathways. This research may contribute to the development of more efficient catalysts for both space and terrestrial applications.

== Experimental platforms and simulation techniques ==
The study of low-gravity processes requires specialized platforms and techniques to simulate or create microgravity conditions. These methods range from ground-based facilities to orbital laboratories and computational simulations.

=== Drop towers and parabolic flights ===
Drop towers provide short-duration microgravity environments by allowing experiments to free-fall in evacuated shafts. These facilities typically offer 2–10 seconds of high-quality microgravity. Notable examples include NASA's Glenn Research Center 2.2-Second Drop Tower and the 146-meter ZARM Drop Tower in Bremen, Germany.

Parabolic flights, often referred to as "vomit comets," create repeated periods of microgravity lasting 20–25 seconds by flying aircraft in parabolic arcs. These flights allow researchers to conduct hands-on experiments and test equipment destined for space missions.

=== Sounding rockets and suborbital flights ===
Sounding rockets offer extended microgravity durations ranging from 3 to 14 minutes, depending on the rocket's apogee. These platforms are particularly useful for experiments requiring longer microgravity exposure than drop towers or parabolic flights can provide.

Suborbital flights, such as those planned by commercial spaceflight companies, present new opportunities for microgravity research. These flights can offer several minutes of microgravity time and the potential for frequent, cost-effective access to space-like conditions.

=== International space station facilities ===
The International Space Station serves as a permanent microgravity laboratory, offering long-duration experiments in various scientific disciplines. Key research facilities on the ISS include:

1. Fluid Science Laboratory (FSL): Designed for studying fluid physics in microgravity.
2. Materials Science Laboratory (MSL): Used for materials research and processing experiments.
3. Microgravity Science Glovebox (MSG): A multipurpose facility for conducting a wide range of microgravity experiments.

=== Computational fluid dynamics for low-gravity simulations ===
Computational Fluid Dynamics (CFD) plays a crucial role in predicting and analyzing fluid behavior in low-gravity environments. CFD simulations complement experimental research by:

1. Providing insights into phenomena difficult to observe experimentally.
2. Allowing parametric studies across a wide range of conditions.
3. Aiding in the design and optimization of space-based systems.

CFD models for low-gravity applications often require modifications to account for the dominance of surface tension forces and the absence of buoyancy-driven flows. Validation of these models typically involves comparison with experimental data from microgravity platforms.

As computational power increases, CFD simulations are becoming increasingly sophisticated, enabling more accurate predictions of complex multiphase flows and heat transfer processes in microgravity.
