= Microgravity University =

Former NASA program

Program logo

Microgravity University, also known as the Reduced Gravity Student Flight Opportunities Program (RGSFOP), was a program run by NASA which enables undergraduate university students to perform microgravity experiments aboard NASA's reduced-gravity aircraft at Johnson Space Center in Houston, Texas.

Acceptance into the program requires a team of four fliers (and any number of ground crew) and was done through the writing and submission (during late Fall) of a technical proposal which details among other things what the experiment was about, safety considerations, and outreach plans. In the 2007 campaign, 34 of the proposals submitted were accepted. Upon acceptance, a flight date was assigned and the team must design and build the planned experiment by then. Prior to flight, submission of a TEDP (an in-depth description of apparatus) was also required, as were FAA approved physical examinations for all fliers and the optional alternate flier.

== Flight week ==
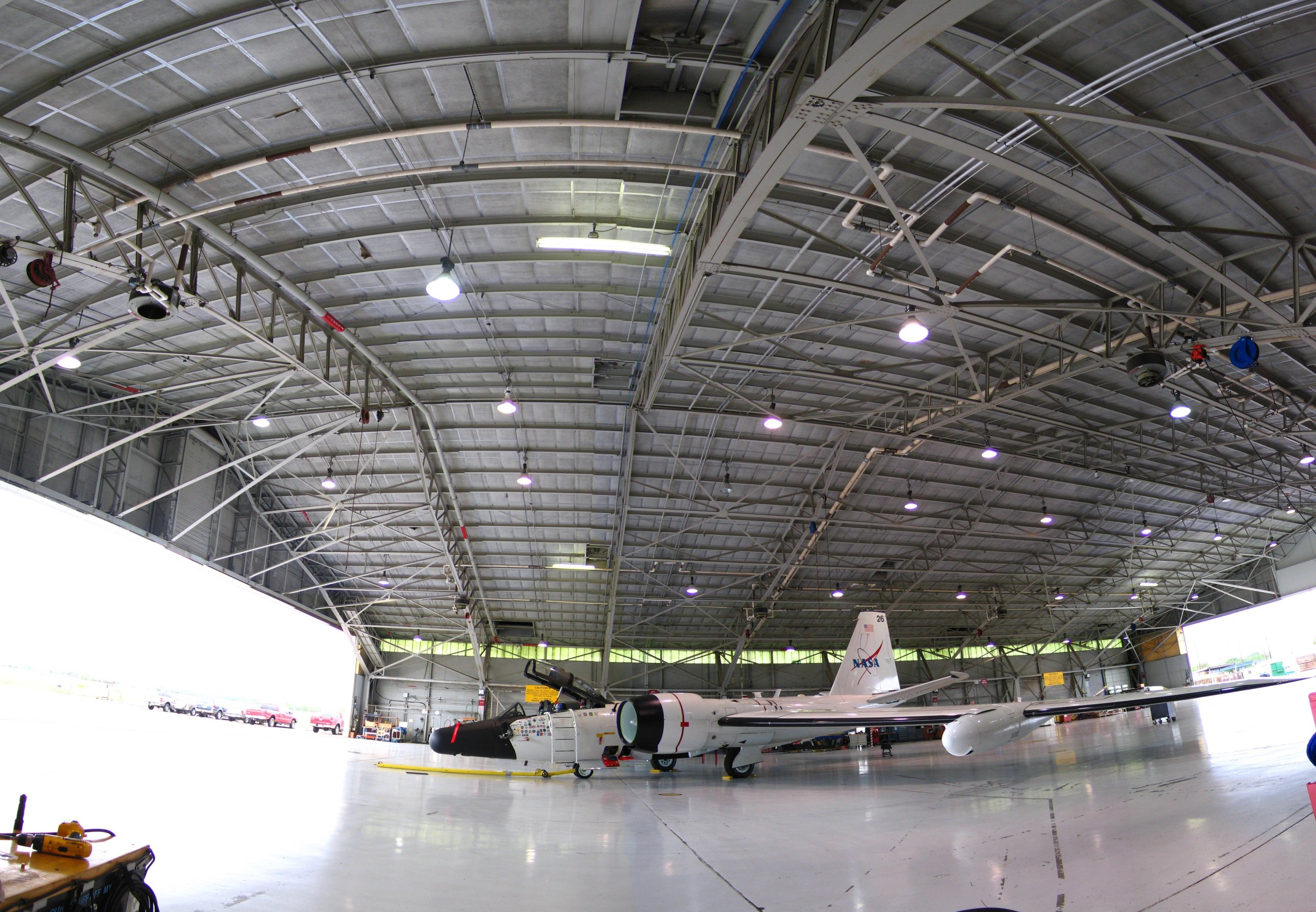
Panorama of hangar 990, with one of the two WB-57s inside.

The flight week began with an introduction to the facility, the crew, and a description of what was planned overall. The rest of the week involved training, tours, setup, and flights.

Setup of the experiment was done at Ellington Field's hangar 990 concurrently for all teams in the flight week. The hangar houses the C-9 as well as NASA's two WB-57 high altitude research aircraft; the setup period typically goes for three days, after which the experiment was loaded onto the C-9, strapped into place, and finalized. Microgravity flights were performed during the next two days: two of the fliers on one day and the other two on the other day.

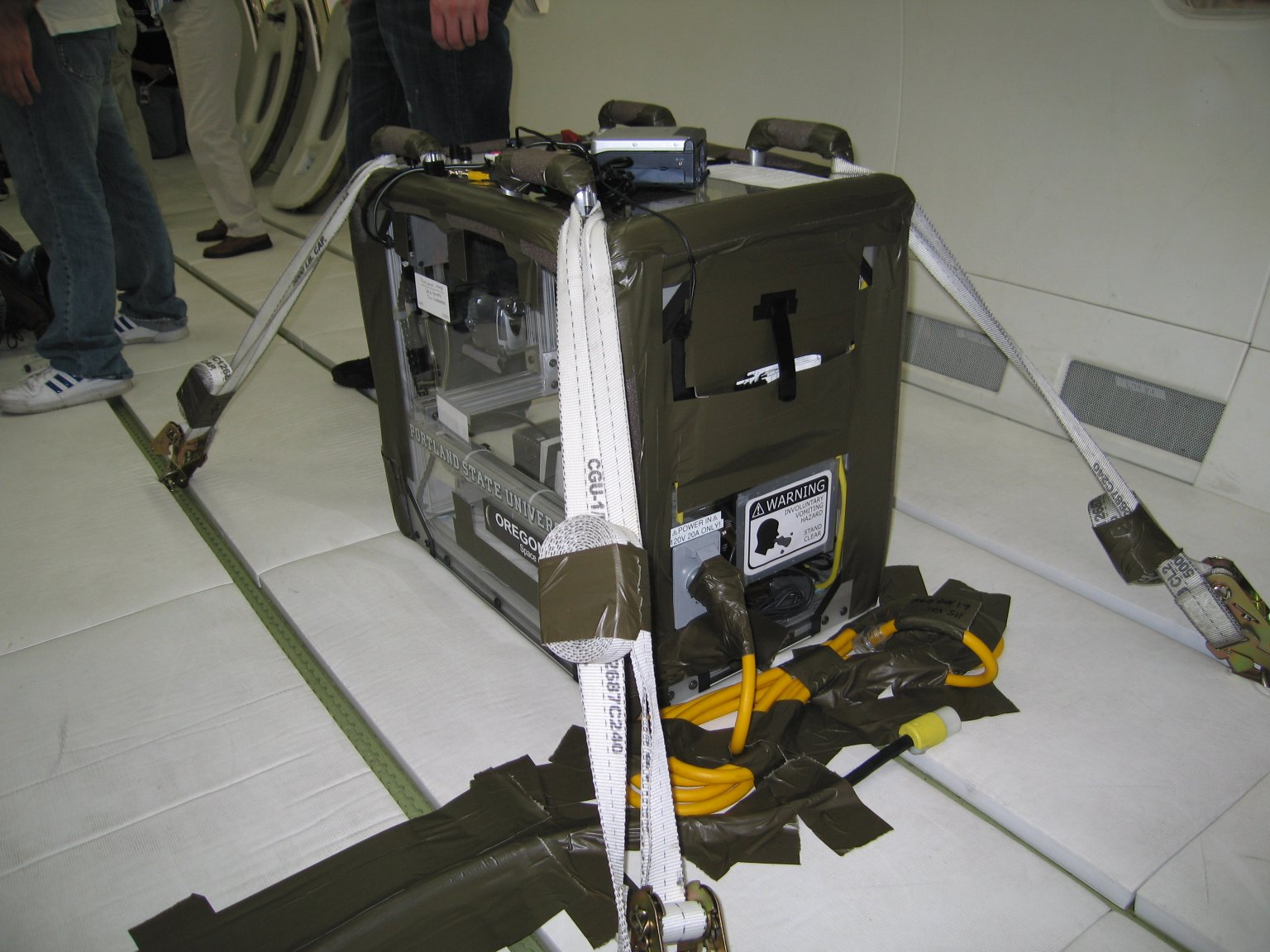
The 2007 Portland State University microgravity experiment loaded onto the C-9 the day before the first flight.

The flight day begins with a briefing which involves last minute instructions and advice, and also the administration of anti motion sickness medicine.

Each microgravity flight contains 30 zero gravity sessions, called parabolas, lasting 20 to 25 seconds each. Additionally, Lunar and Martian parabolas were done (one each).

Transportation and housing for the flight week and the trip to Houston were not provided by NASA and must be arranged by the students.
