= Zero Gravity Research Facility =

- U.S. National Register of Historic Places
- U.S. National Historic Landmark
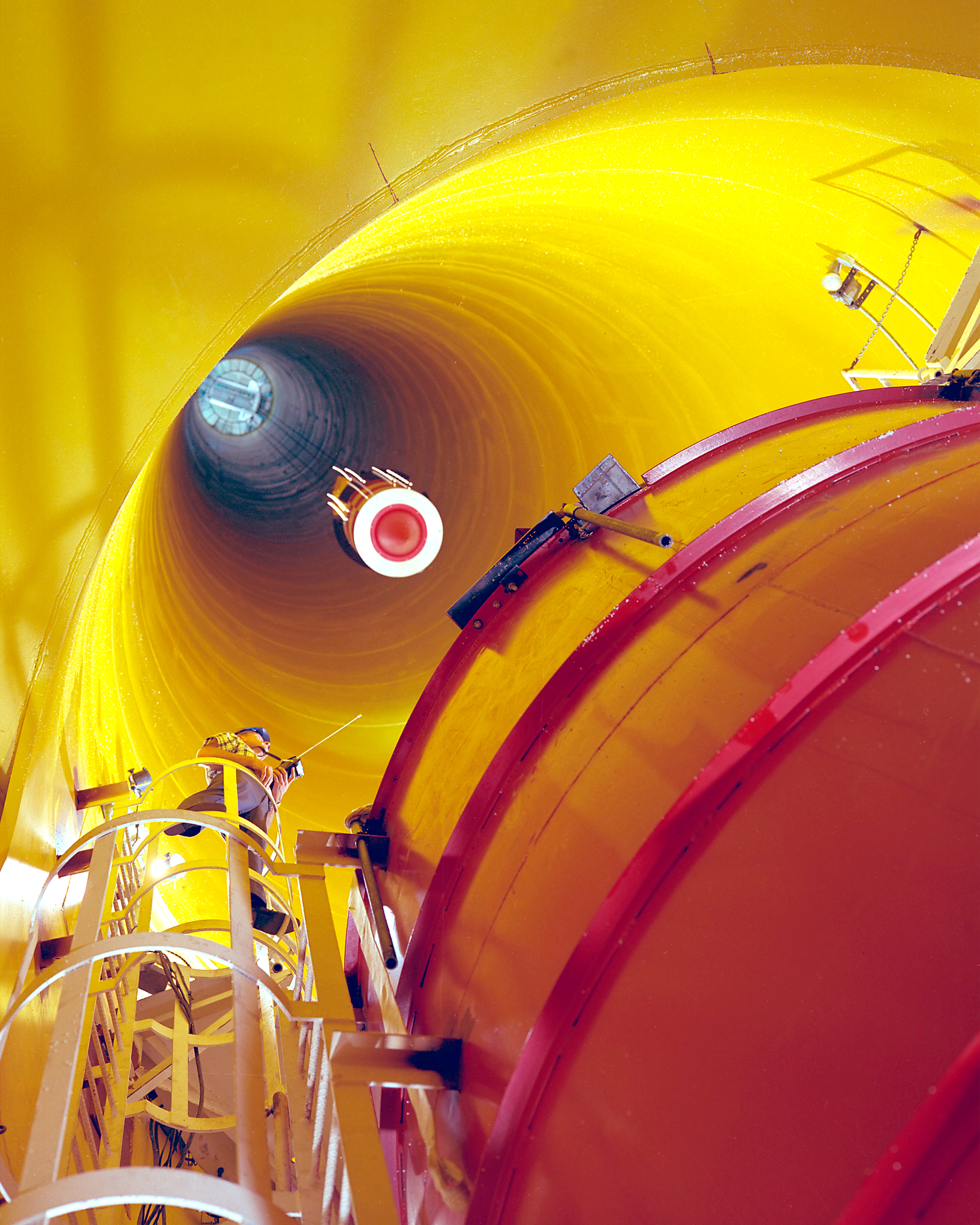

- Location within Cleveland Location within Ohio Location within the United States
- Location: Glenn Research Center, Cleveland, Ohio
- Coordinates: 41°24′44″N 81°51′51″W
- Built: 1966
- Architect: NASA
- NRHP reference No.: 85002801

Significant dates
- Added to NRHP: October 3, 1985
- Designated NHL: October 3, 1985

The Zero Gravity Research Facility at the NASA Glenn Research Center, in Cleveland, Ohio, is a unique facility designed to perform tests in a reduced gravity environment. It has successfully supported research for United States crewed spacecraft programs and numerous uncrewed projects. The facility uses vertical drop tests in a vacuum chamber to investigate the behavior of systems, components, liquids, gases, and combustion in microgravity.

The facility consists of a concrete-lined shaft, 28 feet (8.5 m) in diameter, that extends 510 feet (160 m) below ground level. A steel vacuum chamber, 20 feet (6.1 m) in diameter and 470 feet (140 m) high, is contained within the concrete shaft. The pressure in this vacuum chamber is reduced to 13.3 pascals (1.3×10^{−4} atm) before use. Test equipment is typically mounted in a cylindrical container, and has a maximum weight of 2,500 pounds (1,100 kg). Equipment dropped in the chamber experiences microgravity for about 5.15 seconds before landing in a deceleration cart filled with expanded styrofoam beads; it typically experiences 32 g during deceleration, but may range up to 65 g.

The service building at the top of the shaft contains a shop area, control room, and a clean room. Assembly, servicing, and balancing of the experiment vehicle are accomplished in the shop area. Tests are conducted from the control room, which contains controls for the "pump down" of the vacuum chamber, the experiment vehicle pre-drop checkout, release and the data retrieval system.

== History ==
The Zero Gravity Research Facility was built in 1966 as part of NASA's Centaur upper-stage rocket development program. In order to ensure proper firing and functioning of upper-stage rockets, NASA needed to understand the behavior of fluids (importantly, the liquid gases fueling the rockets), in the reduced gravity where they would fire. The facility was designated a National Historic Landmark in 1985 for its role in the early space program.
