= Center of Applied Space Technology and Microgravity =

Institution at the University of Bremen

Coordinates: 53.1103°N 8.8579°E

The Center of Applied Space Technology and Microgravity (ZARM) is a German scientific institution of University of Bremen involved in research in space technology with applications, among other things, in fundamental physics and gravitation. More than 100 people are employed by the institution.

== See also ==
- Fallturm Bremen
- University of Bremen
