= Hokkaido Space Science and Technology Creation Center =

Hokkaido Aerospace Science and Technology Incubation Center ( HASTIC ) is a network of space development- related facilities and space-related university laboratories scattered throughout Hokkaido to create and start a new industry utilizing space development technology. HASTIC is a private space organization whose main purpose is to contribute to the development of space development in Japan and foster the next generation of researchers and engineers.

== Overview ==
HASTIC was established as a voluntary organization in June 2002, and was approved as a nonprofit organisation in January 2003 with offices in Kita-ku, Sapporo.

HASTIC conducts research and development in five main areas;

- Sounding rocket launches
- Satellite remote sensing
- Space environment utilization (50m drop tower)
- Solid rocket propellant
- Space medicine
- Small uncrewed supersonic aircraft

In addition, HASTIC holds seminars, conducts academic societies, and publishes the public relations magazine "HASTIC News" and "Space News Hokkaido".
