= Fallturm Bremen =

Drop tower at the University of Bremen

Coordinates: 53.1103°N 8.8579°E

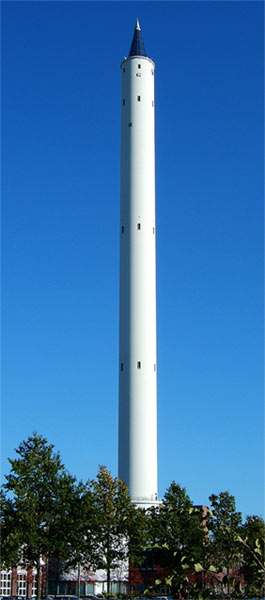
Fallturm Bremen

Fallturm Bremen is a drop tower at the Center of Applied Space Technology and Microgravity at the University of Bremen in Bremen. It was built between 1988 and 1990, and includes a 122-metre-high drop tube (actual drop distance is 110 m), in which for 4.74 seconds (with release of the drop capsule), or for over 9 seconds (with the use of a catapult, installed in 2004) weightlessness can be produced. The entire tower, formed out of a reinforced concrete shank, is 146 metres high.

The 122-metre drop tube is free-standing within the concrete shell, in order to prevent the transmission of wind-induced vibrations, which could otherwise result in the airtight drop capsule hitting the walls. The drop tube is pumped down prior to every free-fall experiment to about 10 Pa (~ 1/10 000 atmosphere). Evacuation takes about 1.5 hours.

In 2021, German and French scientists at the drop tube managed to produce and record the lowest temperature ever measured. Using quantum gas, they managed to achieve 38 trillionths of a degree above absolute zero.
