= University of Bremen =

University in Germany

- Universität Bremen
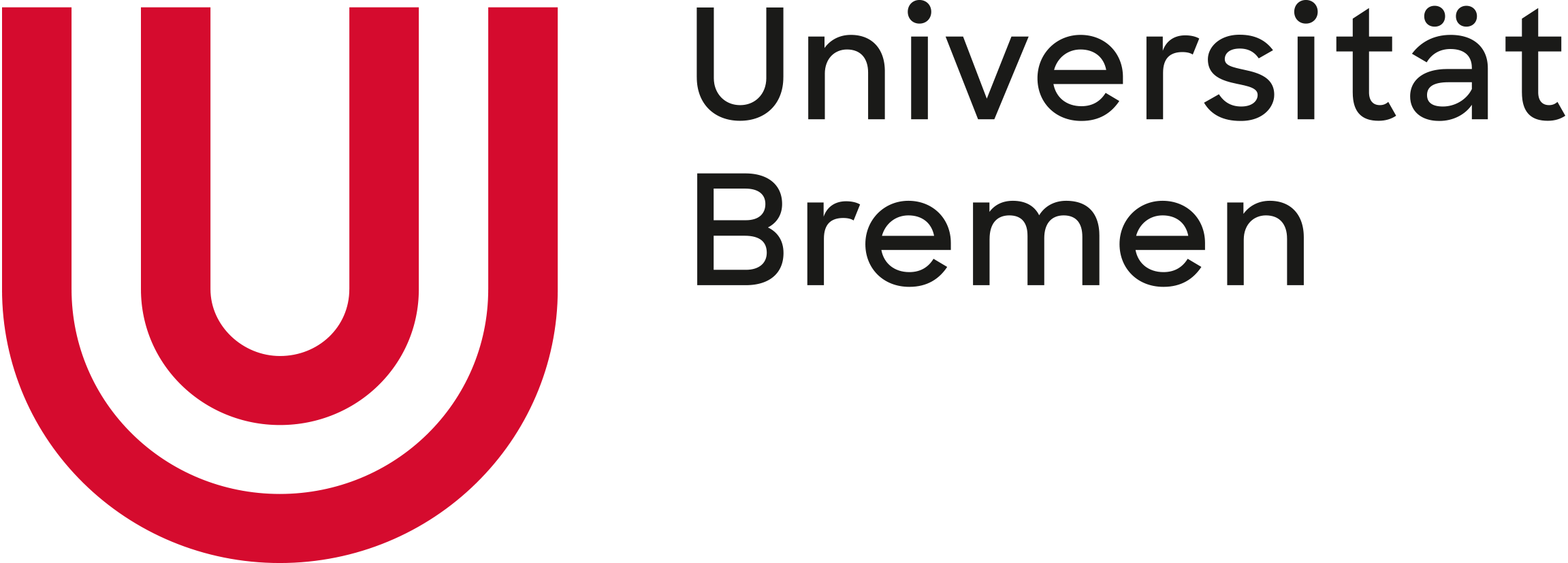
- Type: Public
- Established: 1971; 55 years ago
- Academic affiliations: TPC
- Budget: € 424 million
- Rector: Jutta Günther
- Academic staff: 2,127
- Administrative staff: 1,386
- Students: 18,719
- Location: Bremen, Free Hanseatic City of Bremen, Germany; 53°06′31″N 8°51′13″E
- Campus: Urban
- Website: www.uni-bremen.de
- Location within Germany Location within Bremen

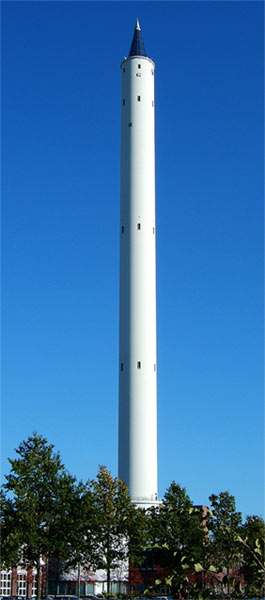
The Fallturm Bremen is a drop tower at the University of Bremen.

The University of Bremen (German: Universität Bremen) is a public university in Bremen, Germany, with approximately 18,720 students from 126 countries. Its 12 faculties offer more than 100 degree programs.

The University of Bremen has been among the top 50 European research universities for more than 50 years and focuses its research on 5 high-profile areas. It is one of 11 institutions which were successful in the category "Institutional Strategies" of the Excellence Initiative launched by the Federal Government and the Federal States in 2012. The university was also successful in the categories "Graduate Schools" and "Clusters of Excellence" of the initiative.

Some of the paths that were taken in the early days of the university, also referred to as the "Bremen model", have since become characteristics of modern universities, such as interdisciplinary, explorative learning, social relevance to practice-oriented project studies which enjoy a high reputation in the academic world as well as in business and industry.

== History ==
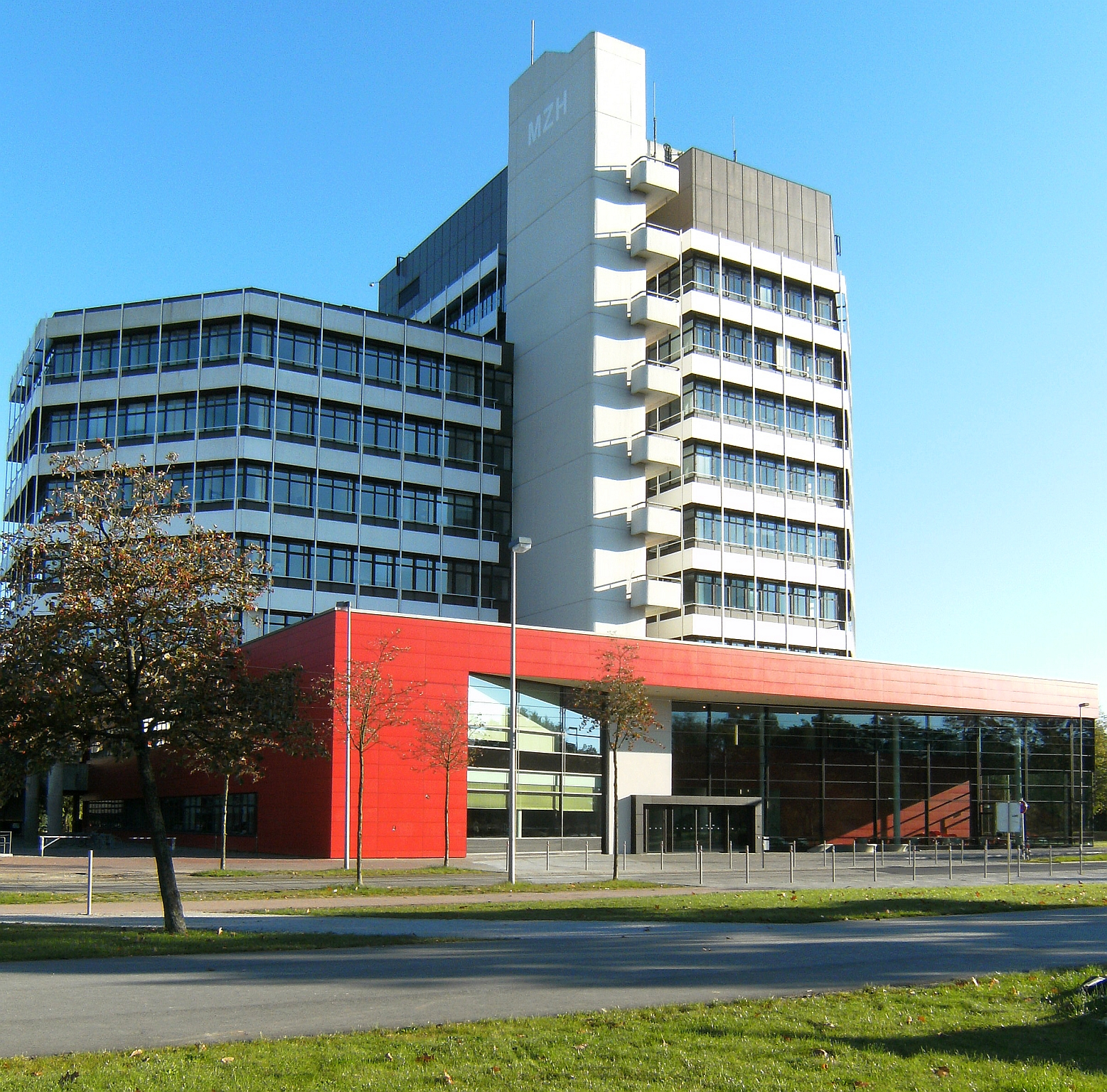
The MZH building at the center of the campus

Though Bremen became a university city only recently, higher education in Bremen has a long tradition. The Bremen Latin School was upgraded to "Gymnasium Academicum" in 1584. In 1610 it was transformed into "Gymnasium Illustre". Under Napoleonic rule, in 1811 the institution of a "French-Bremen University" was considered. In 1971 the University of Bremen opened its doors.

The development of the University of Bremen can be divided up into steps of 10 to 12 years – first foundation, then restructuring, consolidation and profile building. At the beginning of the 1970s, the university was set up as a "science complex" in a city oriented towards trade and seafaring that had no experience with academia, particularly not with leftist professors. University, business and the public in the region did not move closer together until the 1980s, through the foundation of the natural science and engineering departments, co-operation with the newly founded Alfred Wegener Institute for Polar and Marine Research in Bremerhaven (1980), as well as the development of the co-located technology park (from 1988). Other important factors were the initial success in setting up collaborative research centres and in the acquisition of considerable of external funds. The mathematics professor Jürgen Timm, elected university rector in 1982, was largely responsible for this turnaround.

As a consequence, the University of Bremen improved in research rankings, gained national recognition, and established a number of endowment professorships. Research excellence and its interdisciplinary profile is reflected in the establishment of numerous research centers and programs funded by the German Research Foundation (DFG). These currently include eight collaborative research centers and the Research Center of Ocean Margins, one of only six national research centers of the DFG.

From 1996 until 2001 the University of Bremen (along with six other universities in Germany) participated in a pilot scheme for structural reform of university administration, funded by the Volkswagen Foundation. This project improved the co-operation and communication between the university's administration, teaching and research units. With the realization of the "Laptop University" project, the university became a leading university in the field of digital media education in Germany.

By 2000, after an organisational development process of three years in which the university set goals for the development of its profile, this trend was continued with the promotion of junior scientists in structured graduate programs, and staff development programs for the great number of early-stage researchers entering the university as junior professors. In teaching, there are comprehensive evaluations, more specific admission requirements, and improved completion rates for Bachelors and master's degrees.

Bremen was rewarded with the title "Stadt der Wissenschaft 2005" (City of Science of 2005), which science, politics, business and culture won jointly for Bremen and Bremerhaven, by the Foundation for German Science (Stifterverband für die Deutsche Wissenschaft).

The University of Bremen became one of 11 institutions, which were successful in the category "Institutional Strategies" of the Excellence Initiative launched by the Federal Government and the Federal States since 2012. With the Cluster of Excellence “The Ocean Floor – Earth’s Uncharted Interface” of MARUM – Center for Marine Environmental Sciences, the University of Bremen is still part of the German Excellence Strategy and will receive funding from 2019 – 2025. In the current call for proposals, the University of Bremen is once again participating in the excellence strategy competition. The universities of Bremen and Oldenburg have submitted their joint University Excellence Consortium proposal entitled “Northwest Alliance: Connecting for Tomorrow” to the German Council of Science and Humanities as part of the federal and state governments' Excellence Strategy.

In 2020, the university had more DFG Collaborative Research Centers than ever and is regarded the science hub of Northwest Germany. Since the foundation of the Bremen Technology Park in 1988, many research institutes and facilities have settled near the University of Bremen campus. These include the Bremen Innovation and Technology Centre (BITZ), the Center of Applied Space Technology and Microgravity (ZARM), the Bremen Institute for Production and Logistics GmbH (BIBA), the Institute of Shipping Economics and Logistics (ISL), the Fraunhofer Institute for Manufacturing Technology and Advanced Materials IFAM, MARUM – Center for Marine Environmental Sciences, Leibniz Institute for Prevention Research and Epidemiology – BIPS GmbH (BIPS), SOCIUM Research Center on Inequality and Social Policy, Institute of Public Health and Nursing Research (IPP), Leibniz Institute for Materials Engineering (IWT), the German Aerospace Center Bremen (DLR), the German Research Center for Artificial Intelligence (DFKI), MAPEX Center for Materials and Processes, the Centre for Media, Communication and Information Research (ZeMKI), the Data Science Center, Digital Hub Industry (DHI), and the “MaTeNa innovate! Center” for accelerated technology transfer.

== Faculties ==
These are the twelve faculties into which the university is divided:

- Faculty 1: Physics/Electrical Engineering
- Faculty 2: Biology/Chemistry
- Faculty 3: Mathematics/Computer Science
- Faculty 4: Production Engineering – Mechanical Engineering & Process Engineering
- Faculty 5: Geosciences
- Faculty 6: Law
- Faculty 7: Business Studies and Economics
- Faculty 8: Social Sciences
- Faculty 9: Cultural Studies
- Faculty 10: Languages and Literary Studies
- Faculty 11: Human and Health Sciences
- Faculty 12: Pedagogy and Educational Sciences

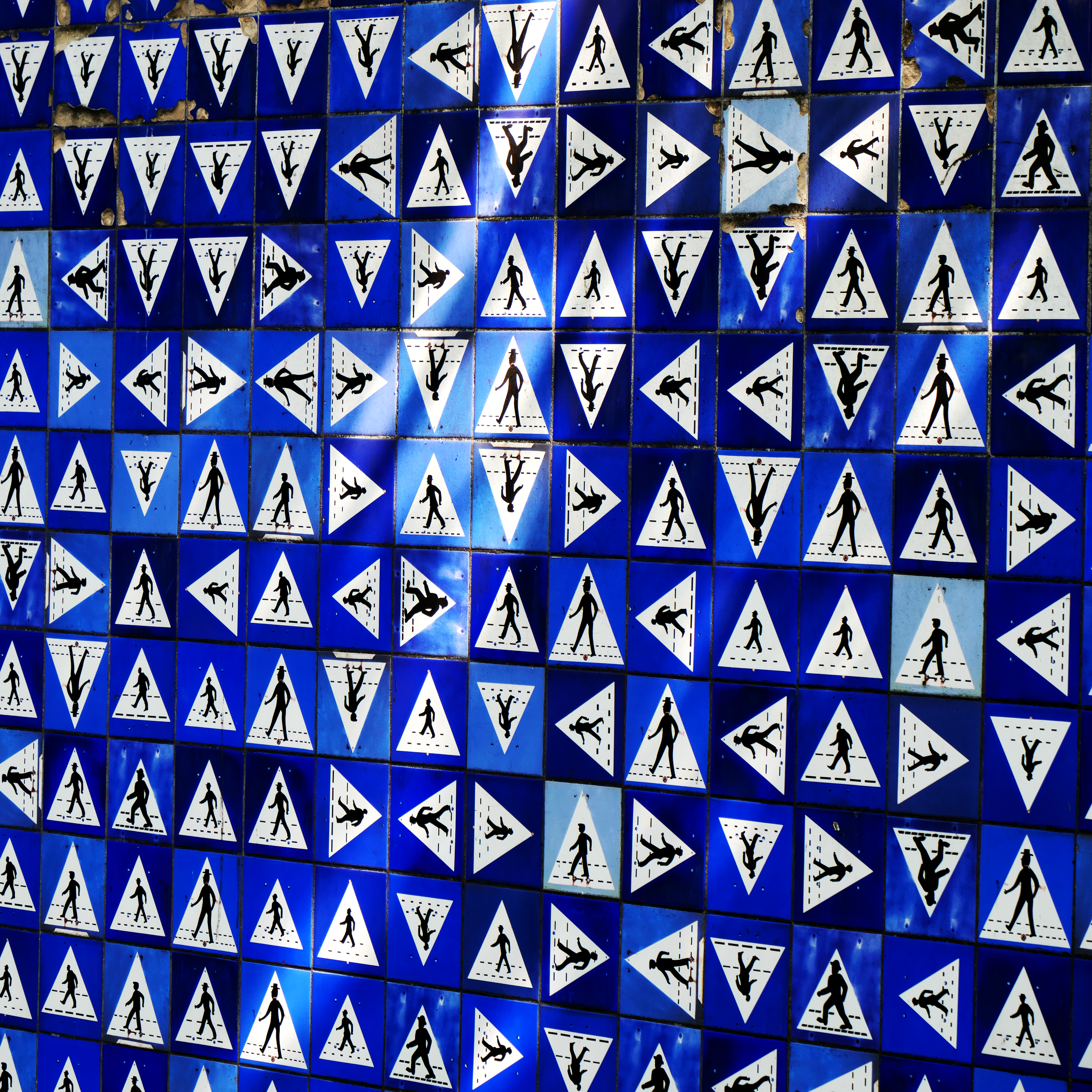
A piece of art on campus

== Academics ==
=== Admission ===
Admission to University of Bremen is highly competitive with big differences in the admission rates between programs.

=== Teaching and learning ===
The University of Bremen is a campus university which offers more than 100 different programs. In 2025 it granted 1,624 baccalaureate degrees, 1,161 master's degrees, 89 State Examination in Law and 255 doctoral degrees. Each year the University of Bremen awards the Berninghausen Prize for excellent teaching. The prize was started in 1992 and is considered to be the oldest teaching award at any German university. Tuition is free for national and international students at the University of Bremen. There is, however, a semester contribution of approx. €450, which includes the Germany semester ticket (D-SeTi) valid nationwide on all local public transport.

== Research ==
The University of Bremen is a research university. It has 12 faculties, but focuses its research on 5 interdisciplinary high-profile areas. They are (1) marine, polar and climate research, (2) social change, social policy, and the state, (3) materials science and production engineering, (4) minds media machines and (5) health sciences.

=== Scientific focus ===
- Marine, polar and climate research
- Social change, social policy and the state
- Materials science and its technologies
- Minds, media, machines
- Health sciences

With interdisciplinary scientific focal points, the University of Bremen has two ongoing DFG-funded Collaborative Research Centers ("Sonderforschungsbereiche" (SFB)) and is involved in four other SFBs.

The Oceans in the Earth System (MARUM) Cluster of Excellence developed in 2007 from the DFG Research Center Ocean Margins, which was founded in 2001.

=== Collaborative research centers ===
The university has as of November 2024 the following SFBs:

- SFB 1342: The Global Dynamics of Social Policy (2018–)
- SFB 1320: Everyday Activity Science and Engineering (EASE) (2017–)

The University of Bremen is also involved in the following special research areas:

- TRR 420: Carbon sequestration at Å resolution – CONCENTRATE (2025–)
- SFB 1464: Relativistic and quantum-based geodesy (TerraQ) (2021–)
- TRR 172: Artic Amplification: Climate Relevant Atmospheric and Surface Processes, and Feedback Mechanisms (AC)³ (2016–)
- TRR 181: Energy transfer in the atmosphere and in the ocean (2016–)

Past SFBs:

- TRR 136: Function-oriented Manufacturing based on Characteristic Process Signatures (2014–2022)
- SFB 1232: From Colored States to Evolutionary Construction Materials (2016–2021)
- SFB 747: Micro Cold Forming – Processes, Characterization, Optimization (2007–2017)
- SFB 597: CRC 597: Changing Statehood (2003–2014)
- SFB/TR8: Spatial Cognition – Inference, Action, Interaction (2003– 2014)
- SFB 637: Self-control of logistic processes (2004–2012)
- SFB/TR4: Process chains for the replication of complex optical components (2001–2012)
- SFB 570: Distortion Engineering – Warp control in manufacturing (2001–2011)
- SFB 517: Neural Basics of Cognitive Performance (1996–2005)
- SFB 460: Dynamics of Thermohaline circulation Variability (1996-2006)
- SFB 372: Spray compacting (1994–2004)
- SFB 186: Status Passages and Risks in the Life Course (1988-2001)

=== Research at Central Research Units (CRUs) ===
CRUs are independent of any particular faculty and fall directly under the responsibility of the University of Bremen's Academic Senate. To be granted CRU status, the objectives and tasks must be interdisciplinary or cross-institutional in nature. There must also be a common thematic focus and the subject of research must be of central strategic importance to the University of Bremen.

The Central Research Units at the University of Bremen currently include:

- artec – Sustainability Research Center
- BIGSSS – Bremen International Graduate School of Social Sciences
- DSC – Data Science Center
- IAW – Institute Labour and Economy
- ITB – The Institute Technology and Education, since 1986
- MARUM – Center for Marine Environmental Sciences (in collaboration with the DFG Research Center for Ocean Margins: RCOM – Research Center Ocean Margins, since 2001)
- SOCIUM – Research Center on Inequality and Social Policy
- UFT – Center for Environmental Research and Sustainable Technology
- zap – Zentrum für Arbeit und Politik
- ZeMKI – Centre for Media, Communication and Information Research
- ZfLB – Zentrum für Lehrerinnen-/Lehrerbildung und Bildungsforschung

=== Research institutes in Bremen and the surrounding area ===
The University of Bremen has concluded a cooperation agreement with the following research institutes in the region:

- Bremer Institut für angewandte Strahltechnik GmbH (BIAS)
- Institute for Applied Systems Technology Bremen GmbH (ATB)
- Institute of Shipping Economics and Logistics (ISL)
- ZARM-Fallturm-Betriebsgesellschaft mbH (ZARM-FaB)
- Bremer Institut für Produktion und Logistik GmbH (BIBA)
- Fibre Institute Bremen e.V. (FIBRE)
- Research Centre for Eastern Europe (FSO)
- Institute for Information Management GmbH (IFIB)

=== Research cooperation on site ===
==== U Bremen Research Alliance (UBRA) ====
The University of Bremen and twelve non-university research institutes funded by the federal states collaborate within the U Bremen Research Alliance. The collaboration spans four key scientific areas: "Marine, Polar and Climate Research", "Materials Sciences and Production Engineering", "Health Sciences", and "Minds, Media and Machines". The U Bremen Research Alliance aims to closely interlink research in Bremen across institutional boundaries. Its activities include research data and data science, as well as artificial intelligence. The U Bremen Research Alliance Welcome Center assists international researchers and their families with planning and carrying out their stay in Bremen and Bremerhaven. The Alliance also offers targeted support in the form of seminars and training courses, including those on acquiring third-party funding.

In addition to the University of Bremen, the members of the U Bremen Research Alliance are:

- Alfred Wegener Institute Helmholtz Center for Polar- and Marine Research (AWI)
- German Research Center for Artificial Intelligence (DFKI)
- DLR Institute of Space Systems
- DLR Institute for the Protection of Maritime Infrastructures
- German Maritime Museum Leibniz Institute for Maritime History (DSM)
- Fraunhofer Institute for Manufacturing Technology and Advanced Materials IFAM
- Fraunhofer Institute for Wind Energy Systems IWES
- Fraunhofer Institute for Digital Medicine MEVIS
- Leibniz Institute for Prevention Research and Epidemiology - BIPS
- Leibniz Centre for Tropical Marine Research (ZMT)
- Leibniz Institute for Materials Engineering - IWT
- Max Planck Institute for Marine Microbiology MPIMM

=== Rankings ===
University rankings

Overall – Global & National
| QS World 2024 | 514 | 32 |
| THE World 2024 | 301–350 | 32–33 |
| ARWU World 2025 | 501–600 | 36–40 |

According to the QS World University Rankings of 2024, the University of Bremen was placed 514th globally and ranked 32nd within its national context. In the Times Higher Education World University Rankings for 2024, the university was positioned within the 301–350 range worldwide, while nationally it fell within the 32–33 range. The ARWU World Rankings for 2023 also showed a similar trend, with the university ranked between 601 and 700 globally and between 37 and 40 nationally.

== University partnerships ==
=== National partnerships ===
The University of Bremen collaborates with various partner universities in Bremen and the region to tap into synergies.

- University of Oldenburg
- Northwest Alliance (NWA)
- Hanse University Alliance

=== European partnerships ===
==== Erasmus ====
The University of Bremen has around 300 partner universities across Europe through the Erasmus program. Over 650 departmental-level agreements facilitate the mobility of students, lecturers and staff. Furthermore, the university coordinates a number of Erasmus cooperation projects. The university also cooperates with partner universities outside Europe via the Erasmus International Dimension program.

==== YERUN ====
The University of Bremen is a founding member of the Young European Research Universities Network (YERUN). Comprising seventeen young, research-intensive universities, the network aims to strengthen their collaboration and represent the interests of young universities at the European level.

==== YUFE ====
The University of Bremen is part of the YUFE (Young Universities for the Future of Europe) university alliance. YUFE offers students and university staff across Europe opportunities to develop in education, research and careers. Alongside the University of Bremen, the alliance comprises nine young and innovative universities and two non-university partners: Maastricht University, Nicolaus Copernicus University, Carlos III Universidad De Madrid, University of Antwerp, University of Cyprus, University of Eastern Finland, University of Essex, University of Rijeka, Sorbonne Nouvelle Université, ETS Global and the Adecco Group.

=== Partnerships worldwide ===
The University of Bremen has partnerships with several hundred universities worldwide, both within and outside Europe. These include institutional-level cooperation agreements, as well as numerous individual student exchange contracts and agreements.

==== Strategic partnerships ====
Extensive contacts and cooperation in research and teaching in several subjects, as well as their comparability in terms of size, objectices and resources characterize University of Bremen's strategic partner universities. There is a mutual agreement to sustainably develop the partnership together.

The University of Bremen's strategic partner universities currently include:

- Cardiff University
- University of Guelph
- Mahidol University
- University of North Carolina at Chapel Hill
- Université de Ngaoundéré
- University of Groningen

== Notable alumni ==
- Yuliia Fediv, a Ukrainian cultural manager and diplomat.
- Hans Koenigsmann, a German aerospace engineer, best known for his work on SpaceX.
- Michael Kölling, a German computer scientist, currently working at King's College London, best known for the development of BlueJ.
- Andreas Bovenschulte, a German lawyer and politician (SPD) who has been serving as the President of the Senate and Mayor of Bremen since 2019.
- Sarah Ryglewski, a German politician (SPD) serves since 8 December 2021 as Minister of State for Federal-State Relations in the first Scholz cabinet.

== See also ==
- Bremen Institute for Applied Beam Technology
- Center of Applied Space Technology and Microgravity
- Fallturm Bremen
- List of colleges and universities
- Hanse Law School – joint project with University of Oldenburg
