= ESA scientific research on the International Space Station =

The following page is a list of scientific research that is currently underway or has been previously studied on the International Space Station by the European Space Agency.

== ESA-reported ISS research and science activity ==
ESA's scientific programme for Life and Physical Sciences is defined by and originates from ELIPS: European Programme for Life and Physical Sciences

=== Life sciences ===
==== Biology ====
- Characterisation of the effects of microgravity on the mechanism of action of Vitamin D in Osteoblasts (VITAMIND)
- Embryonic development of amphibians in weightlessness (AQUARIUS)
- ROle of Apoptosis in Lymphocyte Depression (ROALD)

==== Cardiovascular function ====
- A model for investigating mechanisms of heart disease and mechanisms of activation of sympathoadrenal activity in humans during spaceflight (CARD)

A description of the experiment and the performance status is given in ESA's Erasmus Experiment Archive (EEA) and in addition a condensed account of the experiment's aim and foundation has been provided in ESA's Human Spaceflight Science Newsletter no.1, 2010. The experiment needs 8-10 human test subjects for medical statistics reasons, for it to be completed. The experiment tests two hypotheses that are based on a more than two decades long research in understanding the reaction of the cardiovascular system to exposure to microgravity. The responses that can be observed in Space in the areas of adjustment of blood pressure, resistance in the circulation, tissue fluid filling and urine excretion, etc. do not fit completely with theories. Thus, the new theories for how the observable reactions could be explained.

- Blood pressure circadian rhythms in weightlessness (BMI).[8]
- Blood pressure Measurement Instrument (BMI)
- CARDIOCOG-2
- Cardiovascular adaptation to weightlessness (RHYTHM)
- Effects of microgravity on the peripheral subcutaneous veno-arteriolar reflex in humans. (XENON-1)
- Measurement of heart rate, blood pressure, respiration and blood flow to obtain heart rate variability, blood pressure variability and blood distribution. (SPACE RHYTHMS)
- One-day (24-hour) pattern of blood pressure and heart rate in weightlessness (CIRCA)
- Physiological parameters that predict orthostatic intolerance after spaceflight (AORTA)
- Physiological Parameters That Predict Orthostatic Intolerance After Spaceflight (HEART)
- Studies of airway inflammation during space flight (NOA-1)
- Studies of venous gas emboli during extravehicular activity procedures (NOA-2)
- Study of the evolution of cardiovascular deconditioning phenomena under weightless conditions (CARDIOSCIENCE)

==== Cell and molecular biology ====
- Bone cell mechanosensitivity in weightlessness (FLOW)
- Chromosomal aberrations in blood lymphocytes of astronauts (CHROMOSOME)
- Chromosomal aberrations in blood lymphocytes of astronauts (CHROMOSOMES)
- CHROMOSOME-2
- Cosmic radiation and microgravity related oxidative stress (RAMIROS)
- Effects of microgravity on expression of calcium channels in myocyte - MYOCYTE
- Expression of microbial genes in space (GENE)
- Fischer Rat Thyroid Low serum 5% (FRTL5)
- Microbiological Experiment on Space Station About Gene Expression (MESSAGE)
- Natural killer cell activity in microgravity - NKA
- Signalling through Rho GTPases in microgravity (RHO SIGNALLING)
- Yeast In No Gravity - Part 1 (YING-A)
- Yeast In No Gravity - Part 2 (YING-B)

==== Developmental biology ====
- Effects of the gravity-altered environment on Drosophila motility, behaviour and ageing (AGEING)
- First International C.elegans Experiment: Physiological and genomic study of a nematode worm in space (ICE-first)
- The antibody V(D)J recombination machinery in normal and altered gravity - AMPHIBODY

==== Education ====
- A demonstration of Newton's Three Laws of Motion (VIDEO-2)
- Amateur Radio on ISS (ARISS)
- A test of the basic principles of mechanics (THEBAS)
- Determination of the effect of gravity on the development of a colony of bacteria (WINOGRAD)
- DVD 4
- Electronic - Learning (E-Learning)
- Erasmus Recording Binocular 2 (ERB-2)
- Erasmus Recording Binocular (ERB)
- Neo-Cartilage Formation in Microgravity Environment (CHONDRO)
- Seeds in Space (SEEDS)
- Study of output of bacterial fuel cells in weightlessness (BugNRG)
- Study of the behaviour of a rigid body rotating around its centre of mass (APIS)
- VIDEO-3 (VI3): Filmed demonstrations of the effects of weightlessness on the human body.

==== Endocrinology and metabolism ====
- Cell-Cell Interaction of Monocytes and T-Lymphocytes in microgravity - MIA
- IMMUNO
- Nerve Growth Factor (NGF)
- Neuroendocrine and immune responses in humans during and after long-term stay at ISS (IMMUNO)
- Role of weightlessness on actin metabolism in mammalian cells (ACTIN)
- Sympathoadrenal activity in humans during spaceflight (SYMPATHO)

==== Exobiology ====
- Dosimetry for biological experiments in space (DOBIES)
- Molecular adaptation strategies of micro-organisms to different space and planetary UV climate conditions (ADAPT)
- EXPOSE - astrobiology experiments (EXPOSE-R and EXPOSE-E).
- PRebiotic Organic ChEmistry on Space Station (PROCESS)
- Resistance of lichens and lithic fungi at space conditions (LIFE)
- Resistance of spacecraft isolates to outer space for planetary protection purposes (PROTECT)
- Testing the plant seed as a terrestrial model for panspermia vehicle and as a source for universal UV screens (SEEDS)

==== Fluid balance and kidney function ====
- Renal stone risk during spaceflight: Assessment and countermeasure validation (RENAL STONE)

==== Human factors ====
- Cardiac Adapted Sleep Parameters Electrocardiogram Recorder (CASPER)
- Cultural determinants of performance and error management at the International Space Station (CULT)

==== Human physiology ====
- Ambiguous Tilt and Translation Motion Cues After Spaceflight (Zag)
- Astronaut's Energy Requirements for Long-Term Spaceflight (ENERGY).[79]
- Bone Proteomics (BOP) – a study analyzing protein expression changes in bone tissue after exposure to microgravity.[80]
- Otolith Assessment During Postflight Re-adaptation (Otolith)
- Physiological analysis of skin in space (SKIN)
- SOdium LOading in Microgravity (SOLO)
- The effect of gravitational context on EEG dynamics: A study of spatial cognition, novelty processing and sensorimotor integration (NEUROSPAT)
- Validation of Centrifugation as a Countermeasure for Otolith Deconditioning During Spaceflight (Spin)

==== Immunology and haematology ====
- Blood and Oxidative Stress
- Effects of microgravity on the haemopoietic system: A study on neocytolysis (NEOCYTOLYSIS)
- Monitoring Latent Virus Reactivation and Shedding in Crewmembers (VIRUS)
- PAthway DIfferent ACtivators (PADIAC)
- Role of interleukin-2 receptor in signal transduction and gravisensing threshold of T-lymphocytes (LEUKIN)
- Space flight induced reactivation of latent Epstein-Barr virus (EPSTEIN-BARR)
- The influence of weightlessness on the activation of NF-κB protein (KAPPA)

==== Medicine and health ====
- Long Term Microgravity: A Model for Investigating Mechanisms of Heart Disease with New Portable Equipment (CARD)
- Ambiguous Tilt and Translation Motion Cues After Space Flight (Zag)
- SOdium LOading in Microgravity (SOLO)

==== Microbiology ====
- Bacteria Adaptation to Space Environment - Part 1 (BASE-A)
- Microbial Growth Kinetics Under Conditions of Microgravity (Biokin)
- Microbial life in Space: Response to environmental factors in a space vehicle (MICROSPACE)
- Molecular and physiological analysis of bacterial samples isolated from manned spacecraft (SAMPLE)
- SAMPLE
- Study of the composition, physiology and possible adaptation of microbial communities exposed to weightlessness (SAMPLE)

==== Musculoskeletal system ====
- Crews Health: Investigation on Reduced Operability (CHIRO)
- Hand Posture Analyser (HPA)
- Low Back Pain
- Low back pain (MUSCLE)
- Neo-Cartilage Formation in Microgravity Environment (CHONDRO)
- Response to microgravity of adult stem cells and osteoprogenitors from bone marrow - STROMA 2
- Study of lower back pain in astronauts during spaceflight (MUSCLE)

==== Neurobiology ====
- Crickets In Space 2 (CRISP-2)
- The effect of gravitational context on EEG dynamics: A study of spatial cognition, novelty processing and sensorimotor integration (NEUROSPAT)

==== Neuroscience ====
- An investigation of space radiation effects on the functional state of the central nervous system and an operator's working capacity (ALTEINO)
- Cognitive process for 3-D orientation perception and navigation in weightlessness (COGNI)
- Directed attention brain potentials in virtual 3D space in weightlessness (NEUROCOG)
- Eye Tracking Device (ETD)
- Mental Representation of Spatial Cues During Space Flight (3D-Space)
- Motion perception: Vestibular adaptation to G-transitions (MOP)
- On the contribution of visceral receptors to the sense of subjective vertical
- Sleep-wake actigraphy and light exposure during spaceflight (SLEEP)
- Stress, cognition and physiological response during spaceflight. (COGNISPACE)

==== Plant biology and physiology ====
- Agrospace Experiments Suite
- Arabidopsis Thaliana in Space: Perception of Gravity, Signal Transduction and Graviresponse in Higher Plants (AT-Space)
- Effects of the space environment on the nuclear structure and function of plant root meristematic cells grown in microgravity (ROOT)
- Influence of gravity on the cytoskeleton and the determination of the division plane in plants (TUBUL)
- Study into interaction of effect of light and gravity on the growth processes of plants (GraPhoBox)
- Threshold Acceleration for Gravisensing (GRAVI 1)
- Vine In Near Orbit (VINO)
- Waving and Coiling of Arabidopsis Roots at Different g-levels (WAICO)
- TROPI, or "Analysis of a Novel Sensory Mechanism in Root Phototropism"
- Zucchini plant grown for research -

==== Psychological aspects ====
- Special Event Meals (SEM)

==== Radiation biology ====
- Advanced Dosimetric Telescope on EuTEF (DOSTEL)
- ALTEINO long term monitoring of cosmic rays on the International Space Station (ALTCRISS)
- Biodosimetry in astronauts
- MATROSHKA-1
- Measuring radiation hazards in space (MATROSHKA-2a)
- Study of the depth dose distribution inside a human phantom using the MATROSHKA facility on board the Russian Segment of the International Space Station (MATROSHKA-2B)

==== Respiratory function ====
- Cardiorespiratory adaptation to the space environment (CARDIORESPIR)
- ESANO-1
- ESANO-2

=== Physical Sciences ===
==== Atmospheric physics ====
- Lightning and Sprites Observations (LSO)

==== Combustion ====
- Combustion synthesis under microgravity conditions (COSMIC)

==== Earth observation ====
- Earth Viewing Camera (EVC)
- Observation of environmental phenomena (IMEDIAS)

==== Education ====
- A demonstration of physical phenomena in space. (VIDEO)
- Amateur Radio on ISS (ARISS)
- Earth Viewing Camera (EVC)
- Electrostatic Self-Assembly Demonstration (ESD)
- Oil emulsion experiment

==== Electromagnetics ====
- SOLar Auto-Calibrating EUV/UV Spectrophotometers (SOLACES)

- SOLar SPECtral Irradiance Measurements (SOLSPEC)
- SOlar Variable and Irradiance Monitor (SOVIM)

==== Fluid physics ====
- Selectable Optical Diagnostics Instrument-Influence of VIbrations on DIffusion of Liquids (SODI-IVIDIL)
- Simulation of Geophysical Fluid Flow Under Microgravity (Geoflow)

==== Foams ====
- Foam Casting and Utilization in Space (FOCUS)
- Foam-Stability

==== Fundamental physics ====
- Influence of mass transport and surface growth processes on protein crystal perfection (PCDF/PROTEIN)

==== Metal alloys ====
- Columnar-to-Equiaxed Transition in Solidification Processing and Microstructure Formation in Casting of Technical Alloys under Diffusive and Magnetically Controlled Convective Conditions (CETSOL and MICAST)

==== Morphological Stability and Microstructures ====
- Study of aggregation mechanism and kinetics of ZSM-5 and Silicalite-1 nanoslabs into ZSM-5 / Silicalite-1 hybrid phases under microgravity conditions (NANOSLAB)
- Study of the structure and morphology of zeogrids obtained under microgravity conditions (ZEOGRID)

==== Plasma physics ====
- Atomic densities measured Radially in metal halide lamps under microGravity conditions with Emission and absorption Spectroscopy (ARGES)
- PKE Nefedov plasma crystal experiment (joint Russian-German experiment, 1998 - 2004)
- PK-3 Plus plasma crystal experiment (joint Russian-German experiment)

==== Properties of organic compounds ====
- Diffusion coefficients in crude oils (DCCO)

==== Protein Crystal Growth ====
- Defects in biomolecular crystals induced by growth in space and on Earth (PROMISS)
- Granada Crystallisation Facility (GCF)
- PROMISS-4

==== Radiation dosimetry ====
- Active monitoring of the UV and ionising radiation conditions (R3D)
- Advanced Dosimetric Telescope on EuTEF (DOSTEL)
- Dose Distribution inside ISS (DOSIS)
- Material Exposure and Degradation Experiment (MEDET)
- Particle Flux Demonstrator (Particle_Flux)
- Study of the depth dose distribution inside a human phantom using the MATROSHKA facility on board the Russian Segment of the International Space Station (MATROSHKA-2B)
- Tribology properties of materials in space (TRIBOLAB)
- Under The Background Influence (UTBI)

==== Solution Growth ====
- Study of aggregation mechanism and kinetics of ZSM-5 and Silicate-1 nanoslabs into ZSM-5/Silicate-1 hybrid phases under near weightless conditions (NANOSLAB)

==== Space Technology ====
- Evaluation of a multi-purpose bag specially designed to assist an astronaut to manipulate objects in a weightless environment (MIRSUPIO)
- Functional in-orbit test of a new integrated crew garment system (VEST)
- Heat transfer performances of a grooved heat pipe (HEAT)
- Mouse Telemeter: Calibration of STAR accelerometers (MOT)
- Study of particle spectra and their influence on advanced components (SPICA-S)
- Tactile display aided orientation awareness (SUIT)

==== Technology ====
- 3D Camera (3DC)
- Analysis Experimentation Implementation Algorithms
- Electric Nose Monitoring (ENM)
- Electronics Space Test (EST)
- Erasmus Recording Binocular 2 (ERB-2)
- Erasmus Recording Binocular (ERB)
- Esperimento di Navigazione per Evento Italiano Dimostrativo di EGNOS (ENEIDE)
- EuTEMP
- Food Tray in Space (FTS)
- Garments for Orbital Activities in weightLessness (GOAL) and Vestibular Adaptation to G-Transitions: Motion Perception (GOAL/MOP)
- Heart Beat Monitoring (HBM)
- Low Altitude Zone Ionising Observatory (LAZIO)
- Specular Point-like Quick Reference (SPQR)
