= Space manufacturing =

Production of manufactured goods in an environment outside a planetary atmosphere

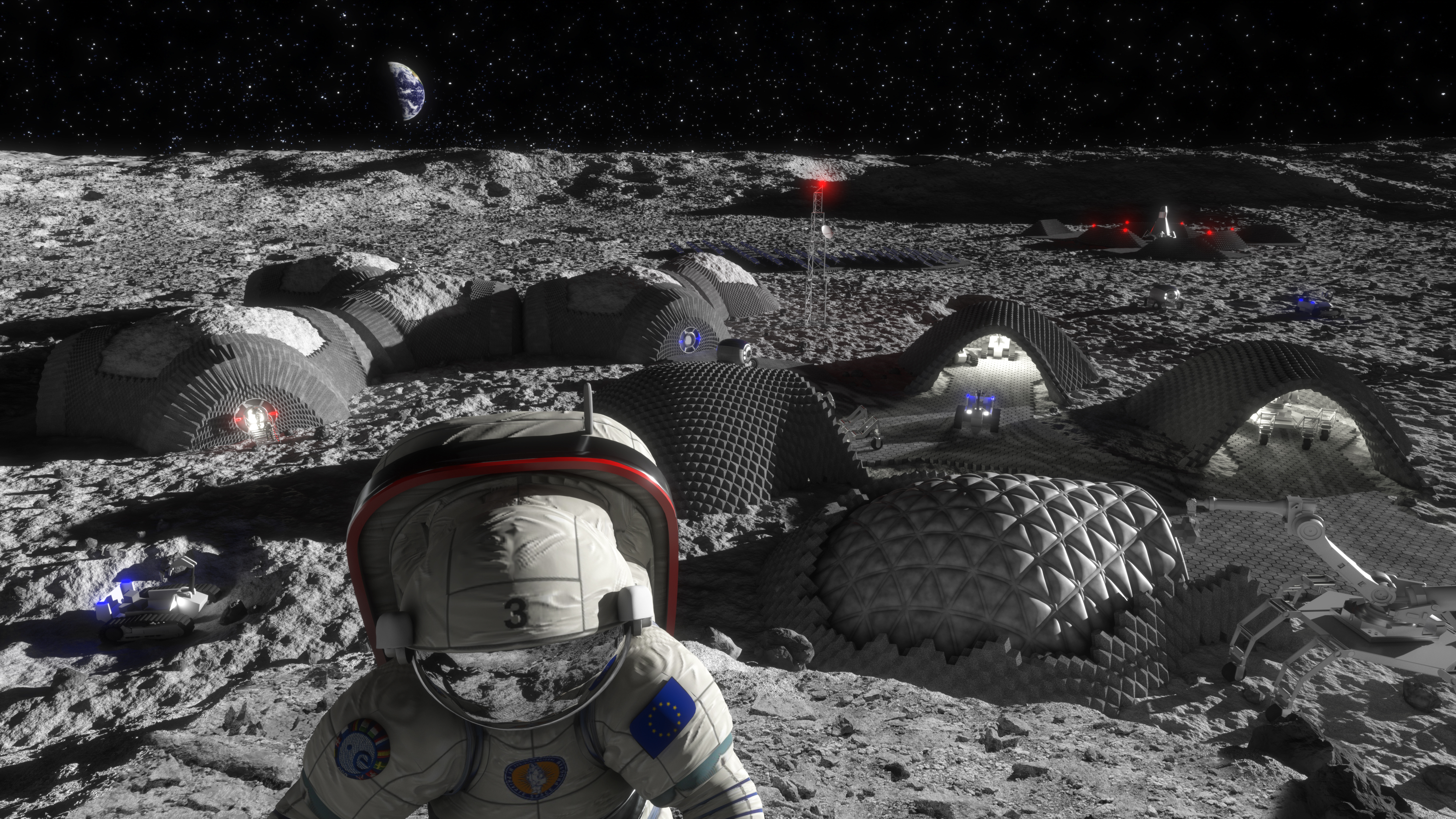
A vision of a future Moon base that could be produced and maintained using 3D printing

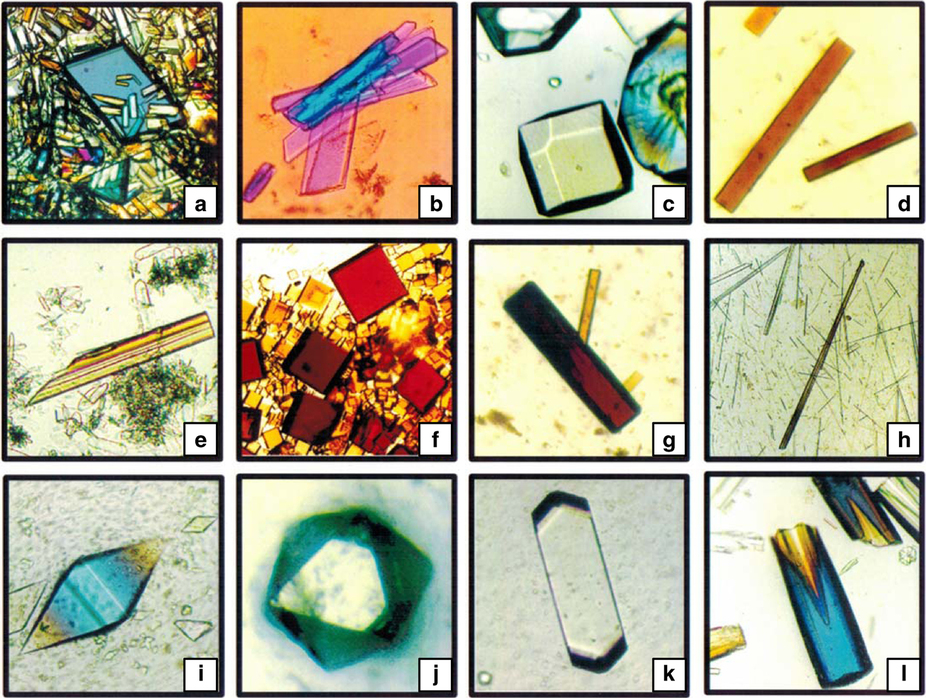
Crystals grown by American scientists on the Russian Space Station Mir in 1995: (a) rhombohedral canavalin, (b) creatine kinase, (c) lysozyme, (d) beef catalase, (e) porcine alpha amylase, (f) fungal catalase, (g) myglobin, (h) concanavalin B, (i) thaumatin, (j) apoferritin, (k) satellite tobacco mosaic virus and (l) hexagonal canavalin.

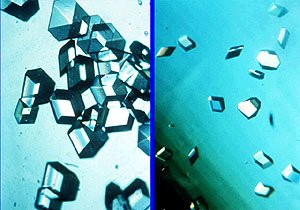
Comparison of insulin crystals growth in outer space (left) and on Earth (right)

Space manufacturing or In-space manufacturing (ISM in short) is the fabrication, assembly or integration of tangible goods beyond Earth's atmosphere (or more generally, outside a planetary atmosphere), involving the transformation of raw or recycled materials into components, products, or infrastructure in space, where the manufacturing process is executed either by humans or automated systems by taking advantage of the unique characteristics of space. Synonyms of Space/In-space manufacturing are In-orbit manufacturing (since most production capabilities are limited to low Earth orbit), Off-Earth manufacturing, Space-based manufacturing, Orbital manufacturing, In-situ manufacturing, In-space fabrication, In-space production, etc. In-space manufacturing is a part of the broader activity of in-space servicing, assembly and manufacturing (ISAM) and is related to in situ resource utilization (ISRU).

Three major domains of In-space manufacturing are ISM for space (space-for-space) where products remain in space, ISM for Earth (space-for-Earth) where goods with improved properties produced in outer-space microgravity are transported back to Earth, and ISM for surface where goods are produced on or sent to surfaces of celestial bodies like the Moon, Mars, and asteroids.

In-space manufacturing uses processes such as additive manufacturing (printing a 3D object in successive layers), subtractive manufacturing (making 3D objects by successively removing material from a solid), hybrid manufacturing (usually combining additive manufacturing and subtractive manufacturing) and welding (joining pieces of material by melting or plasticizing along a joint line).

In-space manufacturing removes spacecraft design limitations due to launch parameters (mass, vibration, structural load, etc.) and volume limitations imposed by payload size. It allows for recycling of launched materials, utilization space-mined resources and on-demand spare parts production, which enables on-site repair of critical parts (increasing reliability and redundancy) and infrastructure development. It takes advantage of unique space features such as microgravity, ultra-vacuum and containerless processing, which are difficult to do on Earth.

== Areas ==
In-space manufacturing (ISM) can be categorized into three different areas according to the end use of manufactured products. In-space manufacturing for space (space-for-space) involves activities focused on in-orbit construction intended for use in space. ISM for Earth (space-for-Earth) is the production of new materials and products that exhibit enhanced properties when manufactured in microgravity, subsequently transported back to Earth. Lastly, ISM for surface extends to surface operations on celestial bodies such as the Moon, Mars, and asteroids.

== Rationale ==
There are several motivating factors behind in-space manufacturing. The space environment, in particular the effects of microgravity and vacuum, enable the research of and production of goods that could otherwise not be manufactured on Earth. Secondly, the extraction and processing of raw materials from other astronomical bodies, also called In-Situ Resource Utilisation (ISRU), could enable more sustainable space exploration missions at reduced cost compared to launching all required resources from Earth. Furthermore, raw materials could be transported to low Earth orbit where they could be processed into goods that are shipped to Earth. By replacing terrestrial production on Earth, this seeks to preserve the Earth. Moreover, raw materials of very high value, for example gold, silver, or platinum, could be transported to low Earth orbit for processing or transfer to Earth which is thought to have the potential to become economically viable. In-space manufacturing supports long-duration space missions and colonization by enabling on-site repair and infrastructure development beyond Earth. Additionally, in the area of spaceflight technology, space manufacturing enhances mission safety by decentralizing manufacturing activities and establishing redundancy in critical systems, allows for customized production tailored to specific mission requirements, fostering rapid iteration and adaptation of designs, drives technological innovation in materials science, robotics, and additive manufacturing, with applications extending beyond space exploration, and lays the foundation for space-based infrastructure development, supporting a wide range of commercial activities and scientific research.

== History ==
During the Soyuz 6 mission of 1969, Russian cosmonauts performed the first welding experiments in space. Three different welding processes were tested using a hardware unit called Vulkan. The tests included welding aluminum, titanium, and stainless steel.

The Skylab mission, launched in May 1973, served as a laboratory to perform various space manufacturing experiments. The station was equipped with a materials processing facility that included a multi-purpose electric furnace, a crystal growth chamber, and an electron beam gun. Among the experiments to be performed was research on molten metal processing; photographing the behavior of ignited materials in zero-gravity; crystal growth; processing of immiscible alloys; brazing of stainless steel tubes, electron beam welding, and the formation of spheres from molten metal. The crew spent a total of 32 man-hours on materials science and space manufacturing investigation during the mission.

The Space Studies Institute began hosting a bi-annual Space Manufacturing Conference in 1977.

Microgravity research in materials processing continued in 1983 using the Spacelab facility. This module has been carried into orbit 26 times aboard the Space Shuttle, as of 2002. In this role the shuttle served as an interim, short-duration research platform before the completion of the International Space Station.

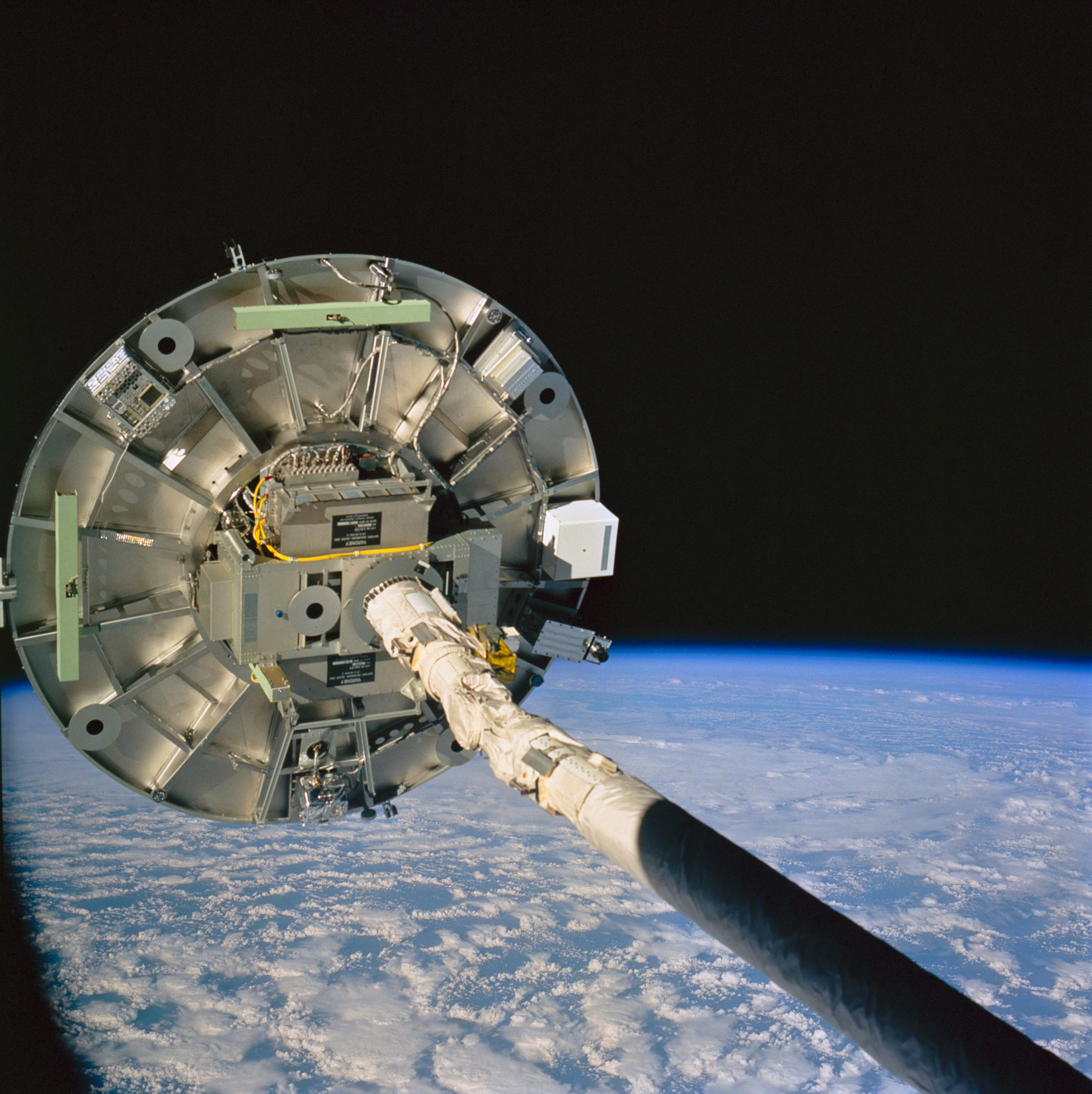
The Wake Shield Facility is deployed by the Space Shuttle's robotic arm. NASA image

In February 1994 and September 1995, the Wake Shield Facility was carried into orbit by the Space Shuttle. This demonstration platform used the vacuum created in the orbital wake to manufacture thin films of gallium arsenide and aluminum gallium arsenide.

On May 31, 2005, the recoverable, uncrewed Foton-M2 laboratory was launched into orbit. Among the experiments were crystal growth and the behavior of molten-metal in weightlessness.

The completion of the International Space Station has provided expanded and improved facilities for performing industrial research. NASA and Tethers Unlimited will test the Refabricator aboard the ISS, which is intended to recycle plastic for use in space additive manufacturing.

The Material Science Laboratory Electromagnetic Levitator (MSL-EML) on board the Columbus Laboratory is a science facility that can be used to study the melting and solidification properties of various materials. The Fluid Science Laboratory (FSL) is used to study the behavior of liquids in microgravity.

== Material properties in the space environment ==
There are several unique differences between the properties of materials in space compared to the same materials on the Earth. These differences can be exploited to produce unique or improved manufacturing techniques.

- The microgravity environment allows control of convection in liquids or gasses, and the elimination of sedimentation. Diffusion becomes the primary means of material mixing, allowing otherwise immiscible materials to be intermixed.
- The environment allows enhanced growth of larger, higher-quality crystals in solution.
- The ultraclean vacuum of space allows the creation of very pure materials and objects. The use of vapor deposition can be used to build up materials layer by layer, free from defects.
- Surface tension causes liquids in microgravity to form perfectly round spheres. This can cause problems when trying to pump liquids through a conduit, but it is very useful when perfect spheres of consistent size are needed for an application.
- Space can provide readily available extremes of heat and cold. Sunlight can be focused to concentrate enough heat to melt the materials, while objects kept in perpetual shade are exposed to temperatures close to absolute zero. The temperature gradient can be exploited to produce strong, glassy materials.

== Material processing ==
For most manufacturing applications, specific material requirements must be satisfied. Mineral ores need to be refined to extract specific metals, and volatile organic compounds will need to be purified. Ideally these raw materials are delivered to the processing site in an economical manner, where time to arrival, propulsion energy expenditure, and extraction costs are factored into the planning process. Minerals can be obtained from asteroids, the lunar surface, or a planetary body. Volatiles could potentially be obtained from a comet, carbonaceous chondrite or "C-Type" asteroids, or the moons of Mars or other planets. It may also prove possible to extract hydrogen in the form of water ice or hydrated minerals from cold traps on the poles of the Moon.

Unless the materials processing and the manufacturing sites are co-located with the resource extraction facilities, the raw materials would need to be moved about the Solar System. There are several proposed means of providing propulsion for this material, including solar sails, electric sails, magnetic sails, electric ion thrusters, microwave electrothermal thrusters, or mass drivers (this last method uses a sequence of electromagnets mounted in a line to accelerate a conducting material).

At the materials processing facility, the incoming materials will need to be captured by some means. Maneuvering rockets attached to the load can park the content in a matching orbit. Alternatively, if the load is moving at a low delta-v relative to the destination, then it can be captured by means of a mass catcher. This could consist of a large, flexible net or inflatable structure that would transfer the momentum of the mass to the larger facility. Once in place, the materials can be moved into place by mechanical means or by means of small thrusters.

Materials can be used for manufacturing either in their raw form, or by processing them to extract the constituent elements. Processing techniques include various chemical, thermal, electrolytic, and magnetic methods for separation. In the near term, relatively straightforward methods can be used to extract aluminum, iron, oxygen, and silicon from lunar and asteroidal sources. Less concentrated elements will likely require more advanced processing facilities, which may have to wait until a space manufacturing infrastructure is fully developed.

Some of the chemical processes will require a source of hydrogen for the production of water and acid mixtures. Hydrogen gas can also be used to extract oxygen from the lunar regolith, although the process is not very efficient. So a readily available source of useful volatiles is a positive factor in the development of space manufacturing. Alternatively, oxygen can be liberated from the lunar regolith without reusing any imported materials by heating the regolith to 4,530 °F (2,500 °C) in a vacuum. This was tested on Earth with lunar simulant in a vacuum chamber. As much as 20% of the sample was released as free oxygen. Eric Cardiff calls the remainder slag. This process is highly efficient in terms of imported materials used up per batch, but is not the most efficient process in energy per kilogram of oxygen.

One proposed method of purifying asteroid materials is through the use of carbon monoxide (CO). Heating the material to 500 °F (260 °C) and exposing it to CO causes the metals to form gaseous carbonyls. This vapor can then be distilled to separate out the metal components, and the CO can then be recovered by another heating cycle. Thus an automated ship can scrape up loose surface materials from, say, the relatively nearby 4660 Nereus (in delta-v terms), process the ore using solar heating and CO, and eventually return with a load of almost pure metal. The economics of this process can potentially allow the material to be extracted at one-twentieth the cost of launching from Earth, but it would require a two-year round trip to return any mined ore.

== Manufacturing ==
Due to speed of light constraints on communication, manufacturing in space at a distant point of resource acquisition will either require completely autonomous robotics to perform the labor, or a human crew with all the accompanying habitat and safety requirements. If the plant is built in orbit around the Earth, or near a crewed space habitat, however, telerobotic devices can be used for certain tasks that require human intelligence and flexibility.

Solar power provides a readily available power source for thermal processing. Even with heat alone, simple thermally-fused materials can be used for basic construction of stable structures. Bulk soil from the Moon or asteroids has a very low water content, and when melted to form glassy materials is very durable. These simple, glassy solids can be used for the assembly of habitats on the surface of the Moon or elsewhere. The solar energy can be concentrated in the manufacturing area using an array of steerable mirrors.

The availability and favorable physical properties of metals will make them a major component of space manufacturing. Most of the metal handling techniques used on Earth can also be adopted for space manufacturing. A few of these techniques will need significant modifications due to the microgravity environment.

The production of hardened steel in space will introduce some new factors. Carbon only appears in small proportions in lunar surface materials and will need to be delivered from elsewhere. Waste materials carried by humans from the Earth is one possible source, as are comets. The water normally used to quench steel will also be in short supply, and require strong agitation.

Casting steel can be a difficult process in microgravity, requiring special heating and injection processes, or spin forming. Heating can be performed using sunlight combined with electrical heaters. The casting process would also need to be managed to avoid the formation of voids as the steel cools and shrinks.

Various metal-working techniques can be used to shape the metal into the desired form. The standard methods are casting, drawing, forging, machining, rolling, and welding. Both rolling and drawing metals require heating and subsequent cooling. Forging and extrusion can require powered presses, as gravity is not available. Electron beam welding has already been demonstrated on board the Skylab, and will probably be the method of choice in space. Machining operations can require precision tools which will need to be imported from the Earth for some duration.

New space manufacturing technologies are being studied at places such as Marshall's National Center for Advanced Manufacturing. The methods being investigated include coatings that can be sprayed on surfaces in space using a combination of heat and kinetic energy, and electron beam free form fabrication of parts. Approaches such as these, as well as examination of material properties that can be investigated in an orbiting laboratory, will be studied on the International Space Station by NASA and Made In Space, Inc.

== 3D-printing in space ==
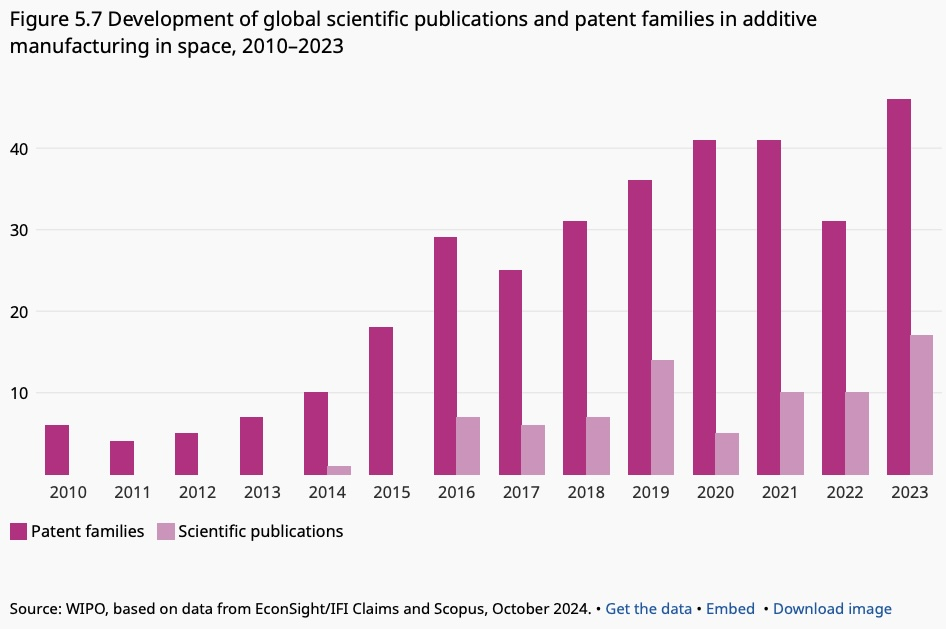
Additive manufacturing in space has progressed from initial research (2014–2016) to early development (2016–2017), with patent activity since early 2020 indicating accelerated advancements.

The option of 3D printing items in space holds many advantages over manufacturing situated on Earth. With 3D printing technologies, rather than exporting tools and equipment from Earth into space, astronauts have the option to manufacture needed items directly. On-demand patterns of manufacturing make long-distance space travel more feasible and self-sufficient as space excursions require less cargo. Mission safety is also improved.

The Made In Space, Inc. 3D printers, which launched in 2014 to the International Space Station, are designed specifically for a zero-gravity or micro-gravity environment. The effort was awarded the Phase III Small Business Innovation and Research Contract. The Additive Manufacturing Facility will be used by NASA to carry out repairs (including during emergency situations), upgrades, and installation. Made In Space lists the advantages of 3D printing as easy customization, minimal raw material waste, optimized parts, faster production time, integrated electronics, limited human interaction, and option to modify the printing process.

The Refabricator experiment, under development by Firmamentum, a division of Tethers Unlimited, Inc. under a NASA Phase III Small Business Innovation Research contract, combines a recycling system and a 3D printer to perform demonstration of closed-cycle in-space manufacturing on the International Space Station (ISS). The Refabricator experiment, which was delivered to the ISS aboard Cygnus NG-10 on November 19, 2018, processes plastic feedstock through multiple printing and recycling cycles to evaluate how many times the plastic materials can be re-used in the microgravity environment before their polymers degrade to unacceptable levels.

Additionally, 3D printing in space can also account for the printing of meals. NASA's Advanced Food Technology program is currently investigating the possibility of printing food items in order to improve food quality, nutrient content, and variety.

Airbus is developing and planning with the European Space Agency to send and test the first 3D-printer printing metals in space at the ISS in a year from 2022, and establishing space manufacturing in three to four years from 2022.

Mitsubishi Electric Research Laboratories (MERL) has developed a UV-curable resin that is stable in the LEO environment, as well as an extruder and positioner to fabricate structures in orbit.

== Products ==
There are thought to be a number of useful products that can potentially be manufactured in space and result in an economic benefit. Research and development is required to determine the best commodities to be produced, and to find efficient production methods. The following products are considered prospective early candidates:

- Growth of protein crystals
- Improved semiconductor wafers
- Micro-encapsulation

As the infrastructure is developed and the cost of assembly drops, some of the manufacturing capacity can be directed toward the development of expanded facilities in space, including larger scale manufacturing plants. These will likely require the use of lunar and asteroid materials, and so follow the development of mining bases.

Rock is the simplest product, and at minimum is useful for radiation shielding. It can also be subsequently processed to extract elements for various uses.

Water from lunar sources, Near Earth Asteroids or Martian moons is thought to be relatively cheap and simple to extract, and gives adequate performance for many manufacturing and material shipping purposes. Separation of water into hydrogen and oxygen can be easily performed in small scale, but some scientists believe that this will not be performed on any large scale initially due to the large quantity of equipment and electrical energy needed to split water and liquify the resultant gases. Water used in steam rockets gives a specific impulse of about 190 seconds; less than half that of hydrogen/oxygen, but this is adequate for delta-v's that are found between Mars and Earth. Water is useful as a radiation shield and in many chemical processes.

Ceramics made from lunar or asteroid soil can be employed for a variety of manufacturing purposes. These uses include various thermal and electrical insulators, such as heat shields for payloads being delivered to the Earth's surface.

Metals can be used to assemble a variety of useful products, including sealed containers (such as tanks and pipes), mirrors for focusing sunlight, and thermal radiators. The use of metals for electrical devices would require insulators for the wires, so a flexible insulating material such as plastic or fiberglass will be needed.

A notable output of space manufacturing is expected to be solar panels. Expansive solar energy arrays can be constructed and assembled in space. As the structure does not need to support the loads that would be experienced on Earth, huge arrays can be assembled out of proportionately smaller amounts of material. The generated energy can then be used to power manufacturing facilities, habitats, spacecraft, lunar bases, and even beamed down to collectors on the Earth with microwaves.

Other possibilities for space manufacturing include propellants for spacecraft, some repair parts for spacecraft and space habitats, and, of course, larger factories. Ultimately, space manufacturing facilities can hypothetically become nearly self-sustaining, requiring only minimal imports from the Earth. The microgravity environment allows for new possibilities in construction on a massive scale, including megascale engineering. These future projects might potentially assemble space elevators, massive solar array farms, very high capacity spacecraft, and rotating habitats capable of sustaining populations of tens of thousands of people in Earth-like conditions.

== Challenges ==
The space environment is expected to be beneficial for production of a variety of products assuming the obstacles to it can be overcome. The most significant cost is overcoming the energy hurdle for boosting materials into orbit. Once this barrier is significantly reduced in cost per kilogram, the entry price for space manufacturing can make it much more attractive to entrepreneurs. After the heavy capitalization costs of assembling the mining and manufacturing facilities are paid, the production will need to be economically profitable in order to become self-sustaining and beneficial to society.

The economic requirements of space manufacturing imply a need to collect the requisite raw materials at a minimum energy cost. The cost of space transport is directly related to the delta-v, or change in velocity required to move from the mining sites to the manufacturing plants. Bringing material to Earth orbit from bodies such as Near-Earth asteroids, Phobos, Deimos or the lunar surface requires far less delta-v than launching from Earth itself, despite the greater distances involved. This makes these places economically attractive as sources of raw materials.

== See also ==
- Acid leaching
- Asteroid mining
- In situ resource utilization
- ISS manufacturing
- Self-replication
- Space-based economy
- Space colonization
- Space elevator
- Spacelab
- Varda Space Industries
