= Phaseolin =

Phaseolin may refer to:

- Phaseolin (protein), the main reserve globulin in seeds of the French bean (Phaseolus vulgaris L.)
- Phaseolin (pterocarpan), a phenolic compound found in the French bean (Phaseolus vulgaris L.)
- Carboxypeptidase C, an enzyme
