= European Programme for Life and Physical Sciences in Space =

ESA microgravity research programme

ELIPS - European Programme for Life and Physical Sciences in Space and applications utilising the International Space Station started in 2001 and was intended to cover the activities for the following 5 years. This Microgravity Programme at the European Space Agency (ESA) is an optional programme, with currently 17 ESA member states participating. The ELIPS programme prepares and performs research on the International Space Station, and other uncrewed mission platforms like Sounding Rockets, in fundamental and applied life and physical sciences. ELIPS is the continuation of the earlier European microgravity programmes EMIR 1&2, and the Microgravity Facilities for Columbus, MFC.

== ELIPS ==
ELIPS (European LIfe and Physical Science in Space) is the European Space Agency's (ESA) research programme for science and application in Space. Most of the experiments are performed on the International Space Station, but also other mission platform that can provide weightlessness during shorter or longer times are utilized, such as drop towers, parabolic flights, sounding rockets and robotic orbital capsules. To prepare for future human exploration of Space, various ground-based investigations are performed, in particular bed rest studies, isolation studies ("analogues") and investigations into biological effects of radiation at ion beam facilities.

The main research fields are fluid physics, material sciences, fundamental physics, physiology, biology, and exobiology. During one year roughly thirty ELIPS supported experiments are performed on ISS and with all platforms it totals about one hundred investigations. All in all about 1500 scientists are involved in the ELIPS programme. Short descriptions and results of all experiments are archived and available at the Erasmus Experiment Archive (EEA).

ELIPS is an optional programme within ESA which receives subscription by 15 participating member states at the ESA councils at ministerial level, taking place every three to four years. Currently, ELIPS 4 is running covering the period 2013-2016. The ELIPS 4 period was granted a budget of 210,- MEuro. Participating countries are Austria, Belgium, Czech Republic, Denmark, France, Germany, Greece, Ireland, Italy, Norway, the Netherlands, Spain, Sweden, Switzerland, the United Kingdom, Romania and Canada through its Cooperation Agreement with ESA. Next Ministerial Council is expected to take place in 2016.

== History ==
The ELIPS programme was defined in 2001 and intended to cover activities for the following 5 years. The ELIPS programme prepares and performs research on the International Space Station, and uncrewed mission platforms like Sounding Rockets, in fundamental and applied life and physical sciences. ELIPS is the continuation of the initial European microgravity programmes, EMIR 1&2, and the Microgravity Facilities for Columbus, MFC.

== From first ESA Microgravity Programme to EMIR 1&2 and the MFC Programme ==
Around 1980 the lack of a coherent European strategy for development of microgravity research became an evident practical hurdle. The lack of coordination of funding was not a viable solution for flying beyond the first Spacelab mission. The solution became ESA's proposal to its delegations to create a Microgravity Research Programme. In January 1982, Phase-1 of that programme was a reality, supposed to fund three costly and necessary multi-user facilities - for Biology, Fluid Physics and as an additional programme, the flying of the first Sounding Rockets under ESA coordination. In February 1985 the delegations approved Phase-2 of the Microgravity Programme, from now on called European Microgravity Research Programme 1 or EMIR-1. The first funding period covered 4 years, with two extensions made in 1988 and 1991, which in essence provided an overall funding package until 1999. Thus EMIR-1 effectively covered a period of 15 years.

EMIR-2 had the objective of covering the research activities until the use of the International Space Station could start, at that time foreseen to be initiated in 2001. It was only partly approved in 1995, which led to a reduced activity level for the coming many years. As the start of ISS utilisation was delayed, the funds had to be stretched, which led to a significantly lower experiment execution than had been the case in the mid-1990s.

The initially 12.8 meters long Columbus Module - ESA's main contribution to the ISS - was for cost reasons gradually reduced to half - 6.4 meters. In addition a barter agreement with NASA maintained 51% of Columbus resources for ESA, the rest to be available for NASA use, under the utilisation agreement. The effect of these measures was that ESA could place four microgravity dedicated facilities in Columbus, the Microgravity Facilities for Columbus or MFC. The MFC programme was approved together with the Columbus Programme in September 1995, and provided a suite of Columbus research facilities, Biolab, Fluid Science Laboratory (FLS), Material Science Laboratory (MSL), together with the first batch of experiments.

Concomitant with this development the Russian built space station MIR was gradually used more and more by international partners, and as such formed an essential basis for experience building, in preparation of building and utilising the coming International Space Station, ISS.

== Objectives of the ELIPS programme ==
The ELIPS programme is the essential programme to ensure that the European investments in the development and exploitation of the ISS would lead to a broad range of scientific results. The ELIPS programme promotes global cooperation, maintains and strengthens international research solicitation and peer reviews. ELIPS also fosters European coordination in terms of facility development and resource utilisation. Initially, a total of 229 experiment proposals had at the time been recommended by independent peers and resided in ESA's Human Spaceflight experiment database. These proposals listed more than 1000 European scientists and almost 125 European non-space R&D companies.

Until the beginning of the era of the International Space Station, European experiment activities were originating either from the European Space Agency, ESA, or from those European countries that had independent national space programmes. Experiments were flown either on board the NASA Space Shuttle on specific Spacelab and Spacehab missions, or later - from the beginning of the 1990s - as payloads on board Russian spacecraft. The main facility for the latter became the Russian Space Station Mir, which orbited the Earth over a period of 15 years, but also the Russian uncrewed Foton (in the early phase named Bion (satellite) satellite programmes were utilised by ESA. These joint activities were regulated under a number of Memoranda of Understanding and contracts stipulating the conditions under which a certain mission would be conducted, rights and duties of the partners, etc.

With the ISS era beginning around 2001, the ESA utilisation science programme proper and the infrastructure aspects were separated into two related but decision-wise independent programmes. ELIPS became the science programme, whilst ISS Exploitation Programme deals with all system and operational aspects of using the ISS. Under the budget for the exploitation programme major elements have been built by ESA as key contributions to ISS. Thus, the Automated Transfer Vehicle (ATV), the Columbus laboratory and the additional barter element Node 2, and the Cupola element have been key contributions.

ESA's main contribution to the International Space Station is the European laboratory module Columbus. It was attached to ISS on 11 Feb 2008 during the STS-122 mission, with two participating European astronauts: Leopold Eyharts and Hans Schlegel. With this milestone, ESA gained its full utilisation rights of ISS, which is 8.3% of the non-Russian part of the station.

== Research plan defining the ELIPS programme ==
ESA chose around 2000 to align the research programme in life and physical sciences with that of the EC. The EC Framework Programme was the principle model for ESA's future research approach, in particular regarding internationalisation of the research teams, although the selection process and the criteria for selection at some points were profoundly different from those of the EC. As a result, the common denominator between the aims and means that ESA has and those of the EC in general terms could be found under the headings: Health Improvement Industrial Development, and Environmental Care.

ESA's capabilities in these areas were defined as a combined implementation of ground based reference experiments and activities to those implemented on board the ISS.

Health Improvement aspects are addressed as a part of the human physiology and biology research related to the ISS activities,

Industrial Development is represented as a topic in the foundation for the Microgravity Application Promotion Projects (MAPs) run by ESA for more than a decade, in the form of team-formation between university researchers, industry research and ESA.

Environmental Care is to a significant extent related to Earth observation, which ISS offers a good platform for.

== European Research Plan ==
Until the definition of the ELIPS Programme, no European research plan had been defined for implementation by the European Space Agency of research under the Manned Space Programme. The research plan was worked out on the basis of a number of criteria, one being an overall set of principle topics: Thus, starting with the ELIPS programme, a proposal should in principle fall under one of the following strategically defined main categories:

- Exploring Nature
- Improving Health
- Innovating Technologies and Processes
- Caring for the environment

Under these strategic headings, six main research domains naturally appear in relation to ESA's research focus, and under these disciplines fourteen so-called cornerstones are identified:

- Fundamental Physics

- Investigate Complex Plasmas and Dust Particles Physics, with particular emphasis on understanding the three-dimensional behaviour of particles in a plasma reproducing fundamental molecular phenomena, and aggregation processes in a vacuum or atmospheric environment, requiring weightlessness.

- Study Cold Atoms and Quantum Fluids, with special significance given to the development and utilisation of a cold atom clock in space, which can attain accuracy levels unreachable on Earth.

- Fluid and Combustion Physics

- Study the structure and dynamics of Fluids and multi-phase systems, such as critical fluids, binary and ternary systems and granular materials, which are non-uniform on a macroscopic scale in the Earth’s gravitational field. Of singular interest are also fluid flows in a central geometry and the evolution of multiconstituent systems like foams and emulsions.

- Perform Combustion experiments with gas, liquid or solid fuels, to quantitatively investigate phenomena superimposed on Earth by buoyancy convection.

- Material Sciences

- Measuring Thermophysical Properties of liquid metals will utilise the possibilities of containerless sample processing under conditions only attainable under weightlessness.

- By eliminating gravity-induced effects, New Materials and Processes can be gained from experiments in space. This encompasses understanding the mechanisms of crystal growth and solidification of metals, inorganic and organic materials, and biological macromolecules.

- Physiology

- In the area of Integrated Physiology study the effects of low gravity, and other extreme conditions, on whole-body regulations, e.g. in the cardio-vascular respiratory and sensori-motor systems.

- Use conditions of reduced gravity to learn about effects of load on functional elements of Muscle and Bone Physiology, e.g. muscle atrophy and bone mass turnover.

- Understand in the field of Neuroscience the effects of gravity on control of posture, locomotion, and cognition.

- Astro/Exobiology and Planetary Exploration

- In the field of Origin, Evolution and Distribution of Life study the survivability of organisms under extreme conditions on Earth, in space, and in (simulated) planetary environments.

- In Preparation for Human Planetary Exploration quantify the effects of radiation doses and investigate the impact of isolation in high-stress environment on humans. In addition, develop the scientific knowledge base for identification and utilisation of in-situ resources. Also study the Life Support for long duration planetary missions.

- Biology

- Examine in the area of Cell and Developmental Biology the effects of an altered gravitational environment on the development of the cell and the whole organism, including reproduction, with special emphasis on signal transduction, gene expression and neural development.

- Study in the field of Plant Physiology mechanosensory elements, e.g. genes and proteins, involved in gravitropism.

- In the area of Biotechnology study under conditions of weightlessness of transmembrane and intracellular flux of mediators controlling cell potency and differentiation as well as cell-matrix interaction.

=== Selection Process ===
The ELIPS programme covers all aspects of selection, developing the necessary hardware and providing flight opportunities for the experiments. ESA is being guided by independent experts in its Advisory Committees as well as the European Science Foundation (ESF) in defining the science priorities under the ELIPS programme. As an outcome of these discussions, the ESF recommended the ELIPS programme proposal and the underlying Research Plan. The selection process of individual experiments or projects starts with dedicated calls from ESA to the scientific community to submit proposals. This is called Announcement of Opportunities (AO). The last major AO for ISS was in 2009, where the one for experiments in Life Sciences was internationally coordinated with NASA, JAXA and CSA and named ILSRA-09 (International Life Science Research Announcement). In parallel ESA issued the AO-2009 for physical sciences on ISS and physics/lifescience experiments on Sounding Rockets. For some less complicated platforms, as drop tower and parabolic flights, ELIPS is open to receive proposals at any time. Research proposals are scientifically evaluated by independent experts (peer review) and if found favourably an initial feasibility assessment is performed. Overall successful candidates are forwarded to ESA's Programme Board for Human Spaceflight, Microgravity and Exploration for formal selection to the research pool of ELIPS projects.

=== Implementation ===
Experiments for the projects selected to the ELIPS pool are implemented as soon as practical, which to a large degree depends on the complexity and cost of the experiment. For experiments on ISS it typically takes a couple of years from selection to realisation, in few cases up to a decade. Experiment hardware is normally provided by the ELIPS programme, whereas the participating researchers have to find funds for themselves from national sources. ESA is further responsible for all transport to space, operations costs and crew resources (if on ISS). Increasingly large or complex experiments, co-operation with other ISS partners (i.e. NASA, JAXA, CSA or Roscosmos) is often sought, in particular for large or complex experiments.

Raw and calibrated data from performed experiments are provided to the scientists for analyses; however the raw and calibrated data formally remain property of ESA, whilst processed data become property of the scientists.

== ISS Facilities ==
In order to support the anticipated research areas on ISS, ESA has built several laboratory facilities. The main ones are Biolab, Fluid Science Laboratory (FSL), Material Science Laboratory (MSL), European Physiology Modules (EPM), and the European Drawer Rack (EDR). Under a barter agreement with NASA Microgravity Science Glovebox (MSG) and the Minus Eighty-Degree Laboratory Freezer for ISS (MELFI) were provided. For exposure science outside ISS, ESA provided the European Technology Exposure Facility and (EuTEF)SOLAR with Columbus in February 2008 and was returned after 18 months.

The facilities were built as multi-user facilities and for that reason provide a considerable amount of adaptability and flexibility, for individual experiments.

Typically the facilities for physical sciences and biology offer accommodation of custom made experiment modules, dependent on the scientific objectives. For physiology a suite of instruments are accommodated.

For material sciences research, typically furnaces are needed that allow melting and solidification of materials samples, whilst fluid sciences research to a larger extent have a need for sophisticated imaging technology on board, for in situ monitoring of the fluids when predetermined impulses and diverse stimuli are given to the fluid sample.

Biology samples typically need a temperature controlled environment, both before, during and after being investigated or processed, and e.g. plant material typically needs a controlled atmosphere in terms of both light quality and gas composition. Further, biology research in these semi-automated settings need a waste management and control system.

Research in the area of human physiology with onboard crew as test subjects needs certain specific measurement and stimulation equipment. A number of such multi-user modules are included in the EPM facility, whilst additional Experiment Specific Equipment has been built for specific use and setups. Finally, NASA has installed the Human Research Facility 1&2 (HRF-1&2) in Columbus, under collaborative arrangements with ESA. ESA has also deployed cardio-respiratory instruments in HRF-2 and in NASA's Destiny laboratory

One general agreement between the Agencies is to avoid duplication of equipment, at the same time as sufficient back-up options would be available. Two arguments were driving this arrangement, namely 1) that equipment for space use is very costly and time-consuming to define and manufacture, and 2) that it was understood, that time and physical resources at all times would represent a significant limitation on board the ISS, such that a collaborative approach would be fostered.

== ELIPS funds both Space and Earth based projects ==
Under the initial ELIPS programme proposal of 2001, a streamlining of already existing scientific activities was proposed. The purpose was to reinforce the synergetic effect between these diverse but in essence related activities, as well as it was argued that good Space experiments necessarily must be preceded by thorough ground based experiments, as well as the peer review process would score well prepared and well funded experiments higher, than experiments only built on an unconsolidated hypothesis. The activities thus suggested to form an overall entity under the ELIPS programme and to be considered for funding as such, were:

- Short term weightlessness experiments in European Drop Towers (up to 4.7 sec natural weightlessness and catapulted up to more than 9 seconds)
- Short term weightlessness experiments on board airplane parabolic flights (weightlessness period in the order of 20 seconds). Such flights normally apply repetitive parabolas up to 30 in one day.
- Short term weightlessness experiments on board so-called Sounding Rocket campaigns from ESRANGE in Kiruna, Sweden (weightlessness periods between 6 and 10 minutes, dependent on type of rocket).
- Access to European Ground Based Facilities of a unique character, such as e.g. centrifuge, accelerator and radiation facilities
- Isolation studies in ground analogues, such as the Mars500 experiment simulating a complete space mission to Mars and using the Concordia station on Antarctica.

Further it was suggested to continue the support of the Microgravity Application Projects (MAP), the private-public teaming between industry, universities and ESA, that had been funded initially under the EMIR programme. and the Topical Team activities, which in general supported the meeting activities of scientific groupings proposed to and selected by ESA for funding.

=== ELIPS programme today ===
In 2010 the results of the last life and physical sciences research announcement were formally approved by Human Spaceflight, Microgravity and Exploration Programme Board (PB-HME). The results of the selection have been reported, starting page 8 in the Human Spaceflight Science Newsletter, September 2010. As of June 2011 there are in total 258 experiments in the "research pool" out of which 163 are for experiments in space and the remainder for ground-based preparatory experiments.
