= PK-4 =

International Space Station experiment

The PK-4 or (Plasmakristall-4) laboratory is a joint Russian-European laboratory for the investigation of dusty/complex plasmas on board the International Space Station (ISS), with the principal investigators at the Institute of Materials Science at the German Aerospace Center (DLR) and the Russian Institute for High Energy Densities of the Russian Academy of Sciences. It is the third laboratory on board the ISS to study complex plasmas, after the PKE Nefedov and PK-3 Plus experiments. In contrast to the previous setups, the geometry was significantly changed and is more suited to study flowing complex plasmas.

== Technical description ==
The heart of the PK-4 laboratory consists of a direct current (DC) discharge tube. A plasma is generated by applying an electric field between an anode and a cathode. Microparticles are then injected into the plasma and move through the tube into the working area where their motion is recorded with two cameras, the images of which are joined for analysis. The movement of the microparticles inside the fields of view of the cameras is followed by experimenters. The polarity of this electric field can be switched at a high frequency, so that the microparticles can be trapped in the working area. A variety of manipulation techniques are available, for instance a manipulation laser that can produce shear flow, and a thermal manipulator which can trap microparticles with a thermal gradient. The optical observation of the microparticles is complemented by other diagnostics methods: a spectrometer and a glow camera that records the plasma glow in several spectral lines.

== Scientific goals ==
As its predecessors, PK-4 Plus studies complex plasmas, which are low temperature plasmas that contain highly charged microparticles. The microparticles interact with each other and with the plasma and can be used to study a variety of topics, for instance waves, the influence of microparticles on the plasma, string formation, and shear flow.
