= Canavalin =

Storage protein found in plants

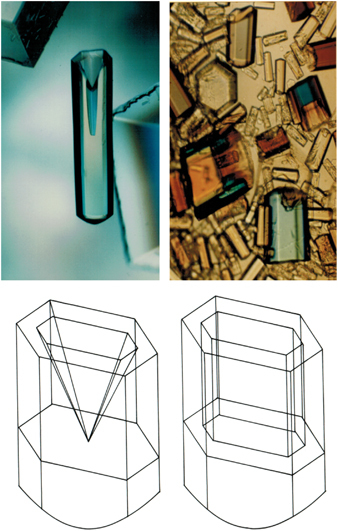
Canavalin crystals grown on Earth (right) and in microgravity.

Canavalin is a plant protein found in the jack bean, sword bean, and related plants. It is the major storage protein found in these plants' seeds, and is one of four proteins readily isolated from the seeds; the others are concanavalin A, concanavalin B, and urease. Canavalin is a vicilin protein homologous to phaseolin.

The crystallization of jack bean seed proteins has been studied extensively since the early 20th century and was of particular interest to 1946 Nobel Prize in Chemistry laureate James B. Sumner, though Sumner's group never fully characterized canavalin and it remained of little interest until its crystallization properties began to be studied in the 1970s. It was among the first reported examples of a protein whose tertiary structure contains two pseudo-symmetrical protein domains. Canavalin has since been used as a model system for studying protein crystallization, most notably in the study of protein crystal formation in space under microgravity conditions.

Canavalin is found in large quantities, the protein makes up about half percent of total soluble proteins. It is part of the vicilin protein part of the seed and has similar characteristics. It is soluble in salt concentrations, and low ionic strength buffers. In saline, canavalin is insoluble and crystallizes. Crystallization occurs at 37 °C. At this temperature the crystals stay together, indicating that the molecule is highly stable. Crystallography demonstrates that the protein consists of six identical subunits organized in a hexamer.

History

In 1919, J. B Sumner first recorded Canavalin to have a molecular weight to 115,000. Sumner isolated the protein from a jack bean, but was not able to crystalize it. In the same research, he named two other proteins he was able to crystallize: concavalin A and concavalin B. Sumner tried multiple times to crystallize canavalin, but his attempts failed. However, in 1936 his student, S. Howell, working in his laboratory left out a sample of canavalin in a flask without regards for sterility. An extended period of time passed and they discovered crystals on the bottom of the flask. They suspected that the crystallization was caused by degradative enzymes produced from microbes. Sumner and Howell were able to reproduce the crystals using sterile solutions of adding trypsin, chymotrypsin and other proteases to the canavalin. They believed the crystallization of the protein was due to hydrolysis of surrounding contaminating proteins. It was also thought that the crystals were a proteolytic product of the native protein.

More work on canavalin appeared in the literature in 1974 from researchers at the Massachusetts Institution of Technology. The researchers reproduced Sumner's work and were able to produce large crystalline structures and describe some of canavalins biochemical properties. Work in 1982 demonstrated that the native protein had a monomer that was cleaved in half by proteases and had mol weight of about 47,000. They also found that the three cleaved monomers were distributed in a perfect 3-fold axis of symmetry in a molecule with a mol weight of about 142,000 and consists of 445 amino acids.

Throughout studying canavalin and other plant seed proteins, it was apparent that canavalin and phaseolin had very similar properties. The differences were that phaseolin was glycosylated and had a mixture of three different subunits, while canavalin had no glycosylation and only one kind of polypeptide. The research showed that canavalin was a part of the vicilin family of seed storage proteins and that its characteristics were shared amount the family.

Homology of Canavalin and Phaseolin

Canavalin and phaseolin are two of the first proteins to show almost identical domain structure using X-ray diffraction analysis. The structure contains β-barrels having the Swiss roll motif. Canavalin and phaseolin share 60% of the same amino acids and have similar tertiary and quaternary structures.

Structure

The 3-fold axis of the canavalin trimer marks a channel in the trimer. The channel is about 18 Armstrongs in diameter and runs free through the protein. The channel is lined with hydrophilic and charged amino acid residues. The trimers are stacked, resembling a preferred packing motif.

Conversion of Precanavalin to Canavalin

Canavalin is derived from precanavalin by proteolytic cleavage. Precanavalin and canavalin are a large proportion of the seed's protein and are assumed to be nutrient proteins that are a source of amino acids for any developing seedlings. Precanavalin has a monomer and exist as a continuous, single polypeptide chain. Canavalin is cleaved from precanavalin, consisting of three polypeptide chains with weights of 24,000, 13,000, and 12,000 D. Canavalin is produced when precanavalin is incubated at 37 Celsius with 2.5% for up to 24 hours. Canavalin can also be obtained by a similar process with chymotrypsin. The production of canavalin with chymotrypsin is less complex and digestion occurs slower, allowing the production to be controlled easier. The protein is first cleaved into two polypeptide chains with molecular weights of 24,000 and 25,000 D. With chymotrypsin, this cleavage is completed within 30 minutes, and trypsin occurs in about 3 minutes. When the digestion occurs at conditions allowing for crystallization, the polypeptide chain weighing 25,000 D is cleaved into two fragments of 12,000 and 13,000 D. These three subunits form the canavalin molecule, resulting in a molecular weight of 147,000 D. The fragment of 24,000 D has nearly identical amino acid composition as fragments 12,000 and 13,000D, implying that homology may exist between primary structures.

Canavalins Response to Different Salt Concentrations

Canavalin extracted from sword bean in distilled water has its monomer structure; however, when placed in high concentrations of NaCl and MgCl_{2}, a change occurs between the monomeric to the trimeric form. The solubility of the quaternary structure of canavalin differed with different concentrations of salt. To form the trimer, increasing ionic strength is an important influence. Also, in the presence of 60mM MgCl_{2} and 200mM CaCl_{2}, the soluble trimer form of canavalin was aggregated. In comparison, aggregation does not occur in 200mM NaCl. These different properties seen with canavalin and different salts might indicate that salt bridges formed through divalent cations. This would prompt aggregation of the trimer form when around MgCl_{2}.

Canavalin belongs to the vicilin fraction from the 7s globulin family. B-conglycinin is classified in the same group also has a trimer structure that can be purified and crystallized in the presence of high salt concentrations such as NaCl. This suggests that in the presence of higher salt concentrations, the trimer structure of 7s globulin family is present. It is unknown if the trimers of 7s globulin are present in the bean seeds. The extract of sword bean canavalin was found to be a monomer and not a trimer, suggesting that canavalin the seeds are in monomer form.

== Genetic Engineering of Canavalin ==
The structure of canavalin is an ideal model for protein engineering. Using recombinant DNA manipulation and x-ray crystallography, canavalin can be genetically altered. Due to site directed mutagenesis, the genetic engineering can happen very quickly. If an engineered gene for canavalin can be inserted into a plant, then nutritionally enhanced seed storage proteins may exist. This would create a possibility for improving and enhancing all of the leguminous plants, a major source of the world's dietary protein.
