= G-jitter =

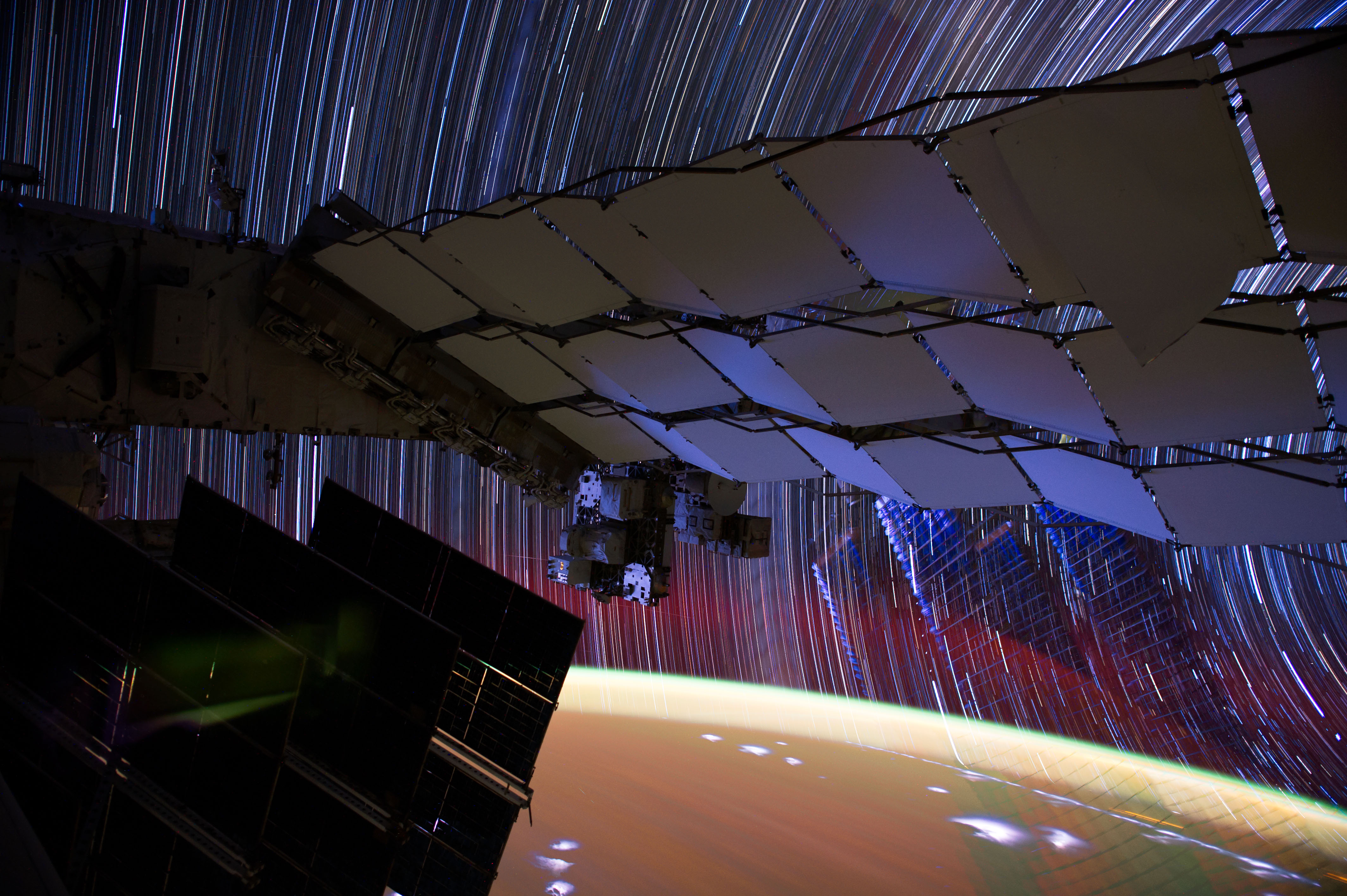
Star trail exposure picture highlighting the rotational motion of the International Space Station.

G-jitter references forms of periodic or quasisteady residual acceleration encountered in a spacecraft floating through the micro-gravity confines of space.

Such variations slightly change the orientation and magnitude of a body force in a low-gravity testing environment, which can either marginally or gravely affect the result of precision-heavy dependent experiments conducted on board a space station. These accelerations are often the result of routine crew activity and equipment operation and the aerodynamic and aeromechanical forces on the spacecraft itself.

Using current theoretical methods and previously collected experimental data, it is impossible to predict the exact behavior of a g-jitter acceleration, but with the aforementioned data, it is possible to notice and account for qualitative trends that hold true for most scenarios pertaining to material science testing on board a space station.

== Sources of G-jitter ==
=== Quasi-steady forces ===
Constant forces that last over 10 minutes while varying periodically in a single frequency can provide a noticeable offset in acceleration readings and deviate a testing environment from "true" micro-gravity. The stronger set of these forces result in non-negligible tidal accelerations and the varying aerodynamic drag of the space station, which fluctuates over the course of an orbit due to the changes in the space station's aspect angle, diurnal cycle, and variable solar activity. In some fringe cases, Euler accelerations must be accounted for as they affect low-pressure physical vapor transport. Coriolis accelerations and solar radiation pressure can be also observed, but are generally negligible in comparison to the effects of other quasi-steady forces.

=== Oscillatory disturbances ===
Generally, if a disturbance can be replicated by a sinusoidal modulation, it is considered to be an oscillatory component of g-jitter. The most noticeable disturbances being routine crew activity and structural vibrations, and can cause a structural resonance throughout a space vehicle. While the average frequency of the structural vibration of a space station is lesser than a Space Shuttle orbiter, the frequency range can still be between the ranges of 0.1 to 1 Hz.

=== Transient disturbances ===
The largest in magnitude are likely to be caused by thruster firings, Shuttle dockings or berthings, and mass translations. Some disruptions can be controlled and timed as to not affect on-site testing, such as thruster firings and Shuttle dockings. The relatively innocuous routinely activities astronauts conduct in a space station ranging from maintenance or moving freely around the station add onto a category of impermanent disturbances that are more spontaneous and unpredictable, which cannot be as easily accounted for.

== Preventing G-jitter ==
Due to the rise in the awareness of the implications of g-jitter, accelerometers with capabilities to attune to a hectic low-gravity environment have begun to be incorporated within space vehicles. Past experiments conducted in the Space Shuttle environment have served as a base to correlate g-jitter's effects to testing in material science and numerically model the residual acceleration to help devise specific experiments for a particular environment. Methods for the analysis of acceleration readings are readily available, but the difficult task of shifting through all the raw data can be facilitated by keeping a timeline of the recorded events and correlate them to a respective residual acceleration.
