= Carboxypeptidase C =

Identifiers
- EC no.: 3.4.16.5
- CAS no.: 9046-67-7

Databases
- IntEnz: IntEnz view
- BRENDA: BRENDA entry
- ExPASy: NiceZyme view
- KEGG: KEGG entry
- MetaCyc: metabolic pathway
- PRIAM: profile
- PDB structures: RCSB PDB PDBe PDBsum
Search
- PMC: articles
- PubMed: articles
- NCBI: proteins

Carboxypeptidase C (EC 3.4.16.5, carboxypeptidase Y, serine carboxypeptidase I, cathepsin A, lysosomal protective protein, deamidase, lysosomal carboxypeptidase A, phaseolin) is a peptidase, an enzyme that degrades proteins. This enzyme catalyses the release of a C-terminal amino acid with broad specificity.

This enzyme is a carboxypeptidase with optimum activity at pH 4.5-6.0. It is inhibited by diisopropyl fluorophosphate.

== See also ==
- Cathepsin A
