= Mass catcher =

Theoretical device

A mass catcher is a theoretical device envisioned to decelerate a mass of material, usually in the context of outer space transport. A large object placed in space with a conical shape would stop other objects hurtling towards the center of the back of it. These other objects would not bounce back into space because small debris from previous impacts with the mass catcher would form a coating similar to regolith, which would absorb the impact and decelerate the object to the velocity of the mass catcher. Interstellar transport of bulk materials would be a potential source of demand for the construction of a mass catcher (e.g. lunar or asteroidal mined ore originally accelerated into a trajectory intercepting the mass catcher by a mass driver). This device was proposed in 1978 by Thomas A. Heppenheimer.

== See also ==
- Mass driver
