= Matroshka experiments =

International Space Station radiation research

The Matroshka (or Matroschka or Phantom) experiments on the International Space Station (ISS) use a mannequin that has been used to study cosmic radiation dose types and rates that relate to the health of space travellers on long duration missions.

The two-part experiment is named for the Matryoshka dolls or Russian nested doll that has various layers of dolls, with the inner layers revealed when the outer layers are opened. In this experiment, the doll has measured the radiation doses of the separate components of the ionizing cosmic radiation at the skin surface and at different locations inside a realistic human torso, in order to establish the relation between skin doses and organ doses.

== Details ==
Matroshka is a human torso (mannequin), a base structure and a container. The container is a carbon fibre structure and formed, with the base structure, a closed volume that contained a dry oxygen atmosphere and protected the torso against space vacuum, space debris, solar UV and material offgassing. It also acts more generally as a simulation of a space suit worn by astronauts during a space walk. Temperature, pressure and experiment data were collected during the mission and transferred to the onboard computer system of ISS, then to the Earth stations for transmission to the experimenters. The torso uses commercial parts common to the field of radiotherapy; various instrumented 'slices' were composed of natural bones embedded in plastics simulating tissue and lung.

The principal investigator is Guenter Reitz, Ph.D. of the German Aerospace Center (DLR), Cologne, Germany.

== MTR-1 ==
Matroshka-1 (MTR-1) was sent to the ISS aboard the Soyuz-U/Progress M1-11 supply vehicle launched from Baikonur Cosmodrome on 24 January 2004, and was placed on the outside of the Russian Zvezda module during a spacewalk during Expedition 8 by Alexander Kaleri and Michael Foale on 15 March 2004, and brought inside during Expedition 11 on 18 August 2005 then the experimental elements were returned to Earth with that crew on 11 October 2005. The main devices remained inside the ISS.

== MTR-2 ==
Matroshka-2 (MTR-2) received its experimental elements (experiment 2A — passive detectors) aboard Progress 20P launched 21 December 2005. These 'slices' were mounted and measured similar data for conditions inside the ISS until active detectors were received later (experiment 2B) to continue dose readings until its eventual return to Earth using replacement sensor parts. The torso returned to Earth on in 2009

== Experiments ==
Active

- Dosimetric Telescope (two passive implanted planar silicon detectors)
- Tissue Equivalent Proportional Counter (ionisation chamber)
- Silicon Scintillator Dosimeter

Passive

- Thermoluminescence Dosimeter
- Plastic-Nuclear Track Detector

== See also ==
- Space physics
- Solar wind
- Cosmic ray
- Radiographic equipment
- Dose profile
- Scientific research on the ISS
