= Fluid Science Laboratory =

Multi-user facility for fluid physics experiment in the Columbus module of ISS

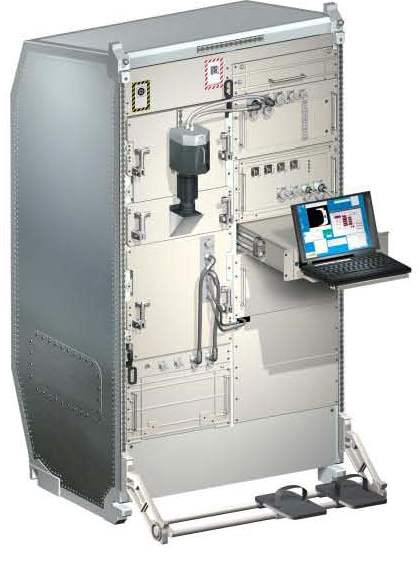
An artist's representation of the Fluid Science Laboratory as it appears in the European Space Agency's Columbus module on the International Space Station.

The Fluid Science Laboratory is a European (ESA's) science payload designed for use in Columbus built by Alenia Spazio, OHB-System and Verhaert Design and Development. It is a multi-user facility for conducting fluid physics research in microgravity conditions. It can be operated in fully or in semi-automatic mode and can be controlled on board by the ISS astronauts, or from the ground in the so-called telescience mode.

The major objective of performing fluid science experiments in space is to study dynamic phenomena in the absence of gravitational forces. Under microgravity such forces are almost entirely eliminated thereby significantly reducing gravity-driven convection, sedimentation and stratification and fluid static pressure, allowing the study of fluid dynamic effects normally masked by gravity. These effects include diffusion-controlled heat and mass transfer.

The absence of gravity-driven convection eliminates the negative effects of density gradients (inhomogeneous mass distribution) that arise in processes involving heat treatment, phase transitions, diffusive transport or chemical reaction. Convection in terrestrial processes is a strong perturbing factor, the effects of which are seldom predictable with great accuracy and which dominate heat and mass transfer in fluids.

The ability to accurately control such processes remains limited, and their full understanding requires further fundamental research by conducting well-defined model experiments for developing and testing related theories under microgravity. This should facilitate the optimisation of manufacturing processes here on Earth and improve the quality of high value products, such as semiconductors.

The Fluid Science Laboratory fully occupies one International Standard Payload Rack. The Facility Core Element consists of the Optical Diagnostics Module and Central Experiment Module into which the experiment containers are sequentially inserted and operated. The Optical Diagnostics Module houses the equipment for visual and interferometric observation, their related control electronics and the attachment points and interfaces for Front Mounted Cameras. The Central Experiment Module is divided into two parts:

- The first part contains the suspension structure for the Experiment Containers, including all the functional interfaces and optical equipment, and is designed to be pulled out from the rack to allow insertion and removal of the Experiment Container.
- The second part contains all the diagnostic and illumination equipment and its control electronics to command and monitor the electromechanical and opto-mechanical components. The Facility Core Element is complemented by the functional sub-systems for power distribution, environmental conditioning and data processing and management.

Experiments must be integrated in an FSL Experiment Container (FSL EC). With a typical mass of 25–30 kilograms (55–66 lb), a maximum mass of 40 kilograms (88 lb), and standard dimensions of 400x270x280 mm (15.7x10.6x11.0 in), the EC provides ample space to accommodate the fluid cell assembly, including any necessary process stimuli and dedicated electronics.

For observation of experiments the Fluid Science Laboratory includes:

- Two-axis visual observation with electronic imaging and photographic back-up via Front Mounted Cameras which provide high speed imaging together with high resolution and colour recording;
- Background, sheet and volume illumination with white light and monochromatic (laser) light sources;
- Particle image velocimetry, including liquid crystal tracers for simultaneous velocimetry and thermometry;
- Thermographic (infrared) mapping of free liquid surfaces;
- Interferometric observation in two axes by convertible interferometers with active alignment:
  - Holographic interferometer;
  - Wollaston - shearing interferometer;
  - Schlieren mode combined with shearing mode;
  - Electronic Speckle Pattern Interferometer.

Flight Support Equipment such as spare parts, special tools and consumables (e.g. cleaning agents), Front Mounted Cameras and Optical Reference Targets for experiment and diagnostic calibration will also be available on board to support customer experiments.

A number of upgrades, partly resulting from new technological developments, have been implemented recently into the Fluid Science Laboratory. Most notable among these are a new Video Management Unit (VMU) and the Microgravity Vibration Isolation Subsystem (MVIS) developed by the Canadian Space Agency. Scientists may choose to activate MVIS to isolate (via magnetic levitation) the experiment and optical diagnostics from space station g-jitter perturbations. The VMU has already provided remarkable good scientific data during the recent CompGran Mission, installed by Alexander Gerst in June 2018. The MVIS system will first be exploited with the upcoming Reference Multiscale Boiling Mission starting in August 2019.

FSL is operated according to ESA's decentralised payload operation concept. The Facility Responsible Centre (FRC) for FSL was MARS, located in Naples, Italy and now is BUSOC Belgian User Support and Operations Centre, located in Brussels, Belgium.

== Related publications ==
- Dewandre T, Mundorf H, Tacconi M, Allegra A, Pensavalle E, Winter J. The Fluid Science Laboratory and Its Experiment Container Program on Columbus. 54th International Astronautical Congress. Bremen, Germany, September - October. . 2003
- Dewandre T, Dubois F, Callens N, Dupont O, Bascou E. Digital Holographic Microscopy fr Emulsions on the Fluid Science Laboratory. International Conference on Space Optics. Toulouse, France. March - April, . 2004
- Dewandre TM, Winter JL. Experiment Containers for ESA's Fluid Science Laboratory. ISPS and Spacebound 2003, Toronto, Canada . 2003

== Gallery ==
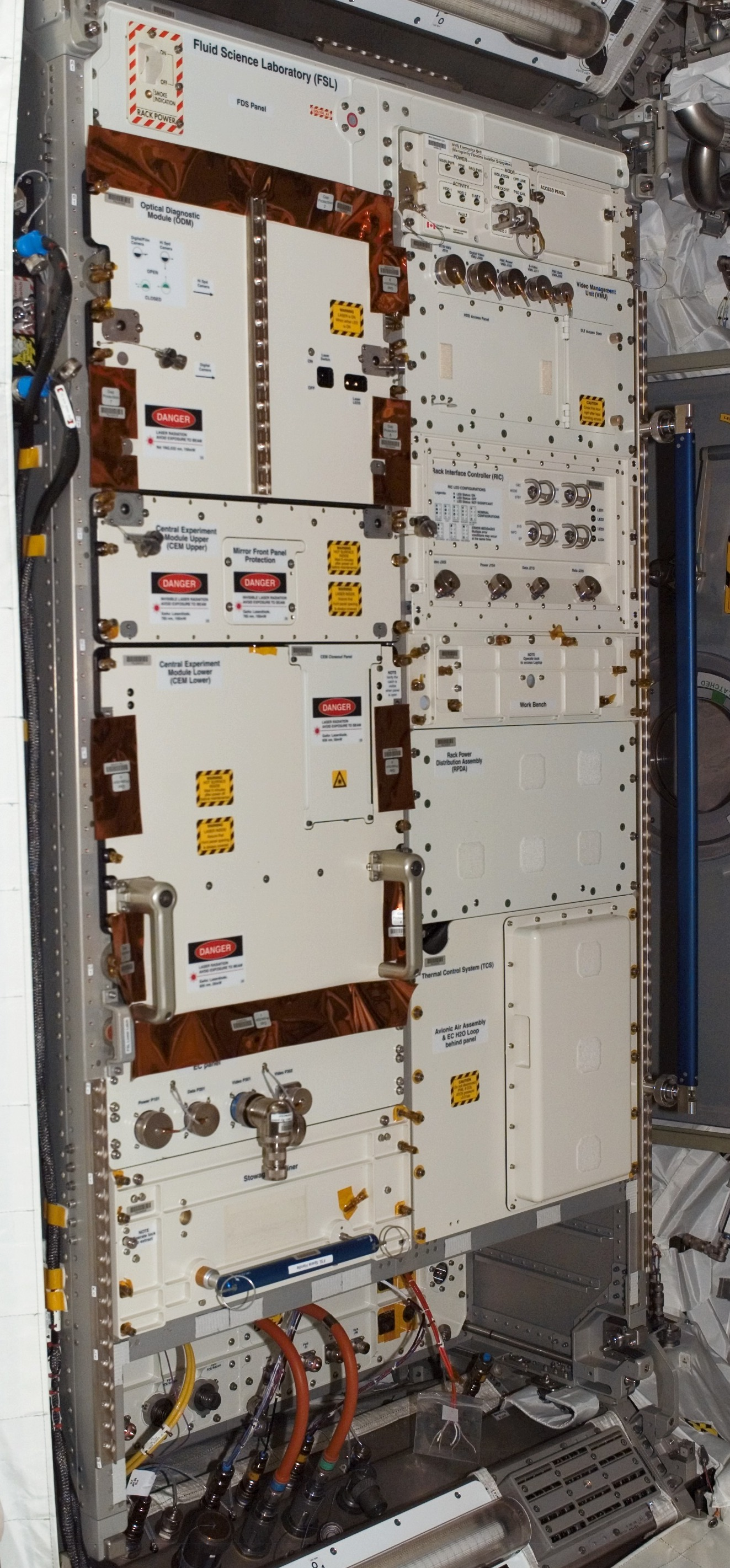
NASA Image: ISS016E031567 - The Fluid Science Laboratory installed in the Columbus laboratory. Image taken during Expedition 16.

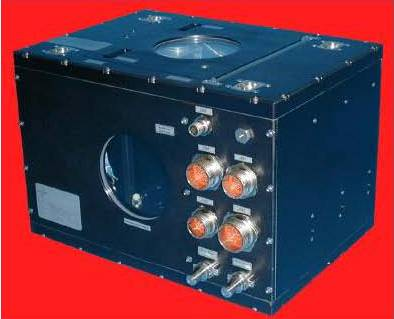
The experiment container that will hold the experiment is inserted into the Fluid Science Laboratory for execution of the science protocol.

== See also ==
- Scientific research on the ISS
