= PK-3 Plus =

Previous International Space Station experiment

PK-3 Plus logo

The Plasmakristall-3 Plus (PK-3 Plus) laboratory was a joint Russian-German laboratory for the investigation of dusty/complex plasmas on board the International Space Station (ISS), with the principal investigators at the German Max Planck Institute for Extraterrestrial Physics and the Russian Institute for High Energy Densities. It was the successor to the PKE Nefedov experiment with improvements in hardware, diagnostics and software. The laboratory was launched in December 2005 and was operated for the first time in January 2006. It was used in 21 missions until it was deorbited in 2013. It is succeeded by the PK-4 Laboratory.

== Technical description ==
The heart of the PK-3 Plus laboratory consists of a capacitively coupled plasma chamber. A plasma is generated by applying a radio frequency voltage signal to two electrodes. Microparticles are then injected into the plasma via dispensers that are mounted on the side of the electrodes. The microparticles are illuminated with a sheet of laser light from the side. They scatter the light, which is then recorded by up to four cameras mounted around the plasma chamber. The data from the cameras are recorded on hard drives that are physically brought back to Earth via Soyuz capsules for analysis.

== Scientific goals ==
PK-3 Plus studies complex plasmas - plasmas that contain microparticles. The microparticles acquire high negative charges by collecting electrons from the surrounding plasma. They interact with each other and with the plasma particles, e.g., they experience a drag force from the ions that are streaming to the edges of the plasma.

Depending on the experimental settings like the gas pressure, the system made up of the microparticles forms various phases - solid, liquid or gaseous. In this sense, the microparticles can be seen as analogous to atoms or molecules in ordinary physical systems. The experiments are performed by observing the movement of the microparticles and tracing them from camera frame to frame.

The PK-3 Plus experiment allows investigating a large variety of topics, for instance: the crystal structure, fluid-solid phase transitions, electrorheological fluids, wave propagation, the heartbeat instability, Mach cone formation and the speed of sound, and lane formation
