= Phaseolin (protein) =

Phaseolin is the main reserve globulin in seeds of the French bean (Phaseolus vulgaris L.). It was named and first isolated and characterized by Thomas Burr Osborne in 1894.

Phaseolin is able to inhibit the activity of the enzyme α-amylase, which is responsible for the cleavage of carbohydrates. Phaseolin-containing plant extracts are used because of this nutritional property in food supplements and medical products. Phaseolin is the subject of various patent applications.
