= Materials Science Laboratory =

European lab on the International Space Station

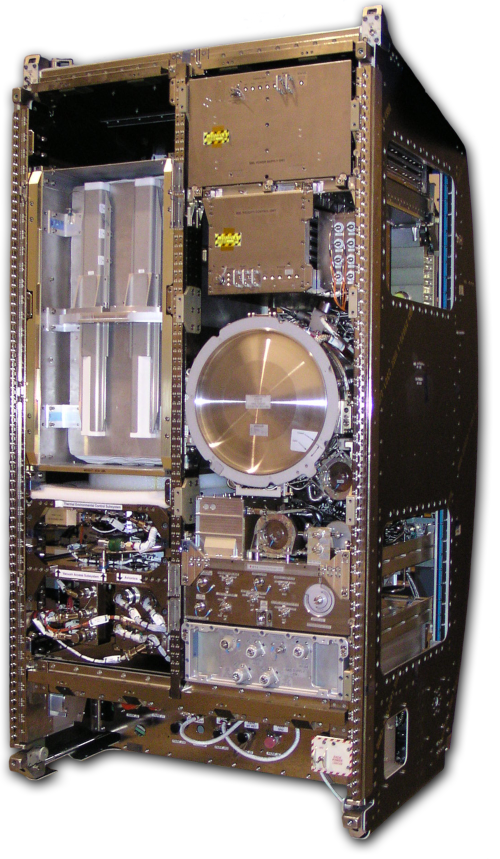
MSRR-1 (NASA)

The Materials Science Laboratory (MSL) of the European Space Agency is a payload on board the International Space Station for materials science experiments in low gravity.

It is installed in NASA's first Materials Science Research Rack which is placed in the Destiny laboratory on board the ISS. Its purpose is to process material samples in different ways: directional solidification of metals and alloys, crystal growth of semi-conducting materials, thermo-physical properties and diffusion experiments of alloys and glass-forming materials, and investigations on polymers and ceramics at the liquid-solid phase transition.

MSL was built for ESA by EADS Astrium in Friedrichshafen, Germany. It is operated and monitored by the Microgravity User Support Center (MUSC) of the German Aerospace Center (DLR) in Cologne, Germany.

== Mission summary ==
MSL was launched with Space Shuttle Discovery on its STS-128 mission at the end of August 2009. It was transferred from the Multi-Purpose Logistics Module to the Destiny Laboratory shortly after the shuttle docked at the International Space Station some two days after launch. After that the commissioning activities started to check out first the functionality of the Materials Science Research Rack and MSL inside MSRR. The commissioning included the processing of the first two samples which took place at the beginning of November. After bringing those two samples back to ground for analysis by the scientists the rest of the samples from batch 1 will be processed in early 2010.

== Core facility ==
The Materials Science Laboratory (MSL) facility is the contribution of the European Space Agency to NASA's MSRR-1. It occupies one half of an International Standard Payload Rack.

The MSL consists of a Core Facility, together with associated support sub-systems. The Core Facility consists mainly of a vacuum-tight stainless steel cylinder (Process Chamber) capable of accommodating different individual Furnace Inserts (FIs), within which sample processing is carried out. The processing chamber provides an accurately controlled processing environment and measurement of microgravity levels. It can house several different Furnace Inserts. During the first batch of experiments the Low Gradient Furnace (LGF) is installed. Another furnace, the Solidification and Quenching Furnace (SQF) is already produced and waiting on ground for future operations. The FI can be moved with a dedicated drive mechanism, to process each sample according to requirements from the scientists. Processing normally takes place under vacuum.

The Core Facility supports FIs with up to eight heating elements, and provides the mechanical, thermal and electrical infrastructure necessary to handle the FIs, the Sample Cartridge Assembly (SCA), together with any associated experiment-dedicated electronics that may be required.

A FI is an arrangement of heating elements, isolating zones and cooling zones contained in a thermal insulation assembly. On the outer envelope of this assembly is a water-cooled metal jacket forming the mechanical interface to the Core Facility.

The major characteristics of the two produced Furnace Inserts are:

- Low Gradient Furnace (LGF)

The LGF is designed mainly for Bridgman crystal growth of semiconductor materials. It consists of two heated cavities separated by an adiabatic zone. This assembly can establish low and precisely controlled gradients between two very stable temperature levels.

- Solidification and Quenching Furnace (SQF)

The SQF is designed mainly for metallurgical research, with the option of quenching the solidification interface at the end of processing by quickly displacing the cooling zone. It consists of a heated cavity and a water-cooled cooling zone separated by an adiabatic zone. It can establish medium to steep temperature gradients along the experiment sample. For creating large gradients, a Liquid Metal Ring enhances the thermal coupling between the SCA and the cooling zone.

== Sample cartridge assembly ==
The samples to be processed are contained in experiment cartridges, the SCAs, that consist of a leak-tight tube, crucible, sensors for process control, sample probe and cartridge foot (i.e. the mechanical and electrical interface to the process chamber). The MSL safety concept requires that experiment samples containing toxic compounds are contained in SCAs that support the detection of potential leaks. The volume between the experiment sample and the cartridge tube is filled with a pre-defined quantity of krypton, allowing leak detection by mass spectrometry. However the first batch of experiments does not contain any toxic substances.

Up to 12 scientific thermocouples provide the sample's temperature profile and allow differential thermal analysis.

== Experiments ==
Materials Science Laboratory - Columnar-to-Equiaxed Transition in Solidification Processing (CETSOL) and Microstructure Formation in Casting of Technical Alloys under Diffusive and Magnetically Controlled Convective Conditions (MICAST) are two investigations which will examine different growth patterns and evolution of microstructures during crystallization of metallic alloys in microgravity.

MICAST studies microstructure formation during casting of technical alloys under diffusive and magnetically controlled convective conditions. The experimental results together with parametric studies using numerical simulations, will be used to optimize industrial casting processes. MICAST identifies and controls experimentally the fluid-flow patterns that affect microstructure evolution during casting processes, and to develop analytical and advanced numerical models. The microgravity environment of the International Space Station is of special importance to this project because only there are all gravity-induced convections eliminated and well-defined conditions for solidification prevail that can be disturbed by artificial fluid flow being under full control of the experimenters. Design solutions that make it possible to improve casting processes and especially aluminium alloys with well-defined properties will be provided. MICAST studies the influence of pure diffusive and convective conditions on aluminium-silicon (AlSi) and aluminium-silicon-iron (AlSiFe) cast alloys on the microstructure evolution during directional solidification with and without rotating magnetic field.

The major objective of CETSOL is to improve and validate the modelling of Columnar-Equiaxed Transition (CET) and of the grain microstructure in solidification processing. This aims to give industry confidence in the reliability of the numerical tools introduced in their integrated numerical models of casting, and their relationship. To achieve this goal, intensive deepening of the quantitative characterization of the basic physical phenomena that, from the microscopic to the macroscopic scales, govern microstructure formation and CET will be pursued. CET occurs during columnar growth when new grains grow ahead of the columnar front in the undercooled liquid. Under certain conditions, these grains can stop the columnar growth and then the solidification microstructure becomes equiaxed. Experiments have to take place on the ISS due to the long-duration required to solidify samples with the objective to study the CET. Indeed, the length scale of the grain structure when columnar growth takes place is of the order of the casting scale rather than the microstructure scale. This is due to the fact that, to a first approximation, it is the heat flow that controls the transition rather than the solute flow. Experimental programs are being carried out on aluminium-nickel and aluminium-silicon alloys.

== Related publications ==
- Schaefer D, Henderson R. Concept for Materials Science Research Facility. 38th Aerospace Sciences Meeting and Exhibit. Reno, NV. Jan 12 -15; AIAA-1998-259. 1998
- Cobb SD, Higgins DB, Kitchens L. First Materials Science Research Facility Rack Capabilities and Design Features. IAF abstracts, 34th COSPAR Scientific Assembly, The Second World Space Congress; J-6-07. 2002
- Carswell W, Kroeger F, Hammond M. QMI: a furnace for metals and alloys processing on the International Space Station. Proceedings of the 2003 IEEE Aerospace Conference; 1:1-74. 2003
- Pettigrew PJ, Kitchen L, Darby C, Cobb SD, Lehoczky S. Design features and capabilities of the First Materials Science Research Rack (MSRR-1). Proceedings of the 2003 IEEE Aerospace Conference; 1:55-63. 2003

== See also ==
Scientific research on the ISS

== Gallery ==
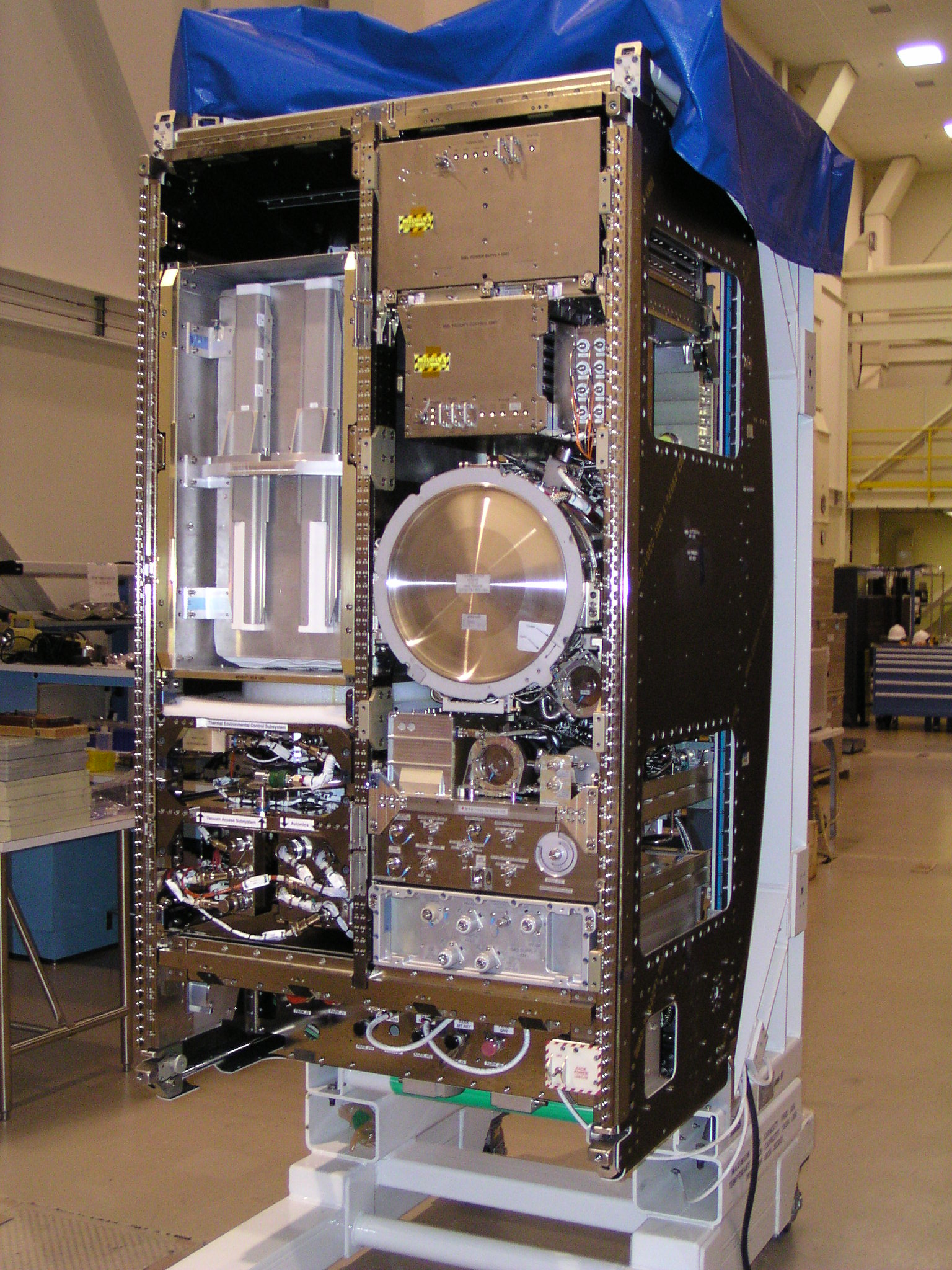
Ground MSRR-1 in launch configuration. The right side of the rack contains the MSL Engineering Model. The left side contains the MSRR-1 Rack Support Subsystems (lower portion) and the stowage container (upper portion). The left side has the accommodations/interfaces to support an additional furnace module if required.

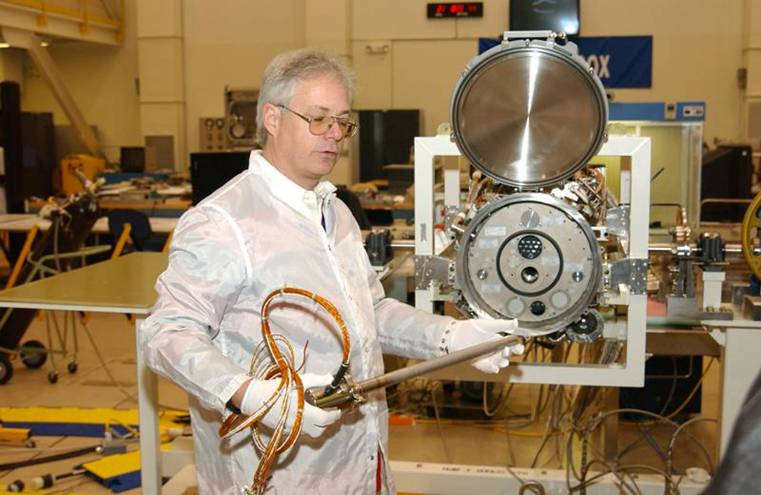
MSL's low-gradient furnace and the Sample Ampoule Cartridge Assembly in 2004.

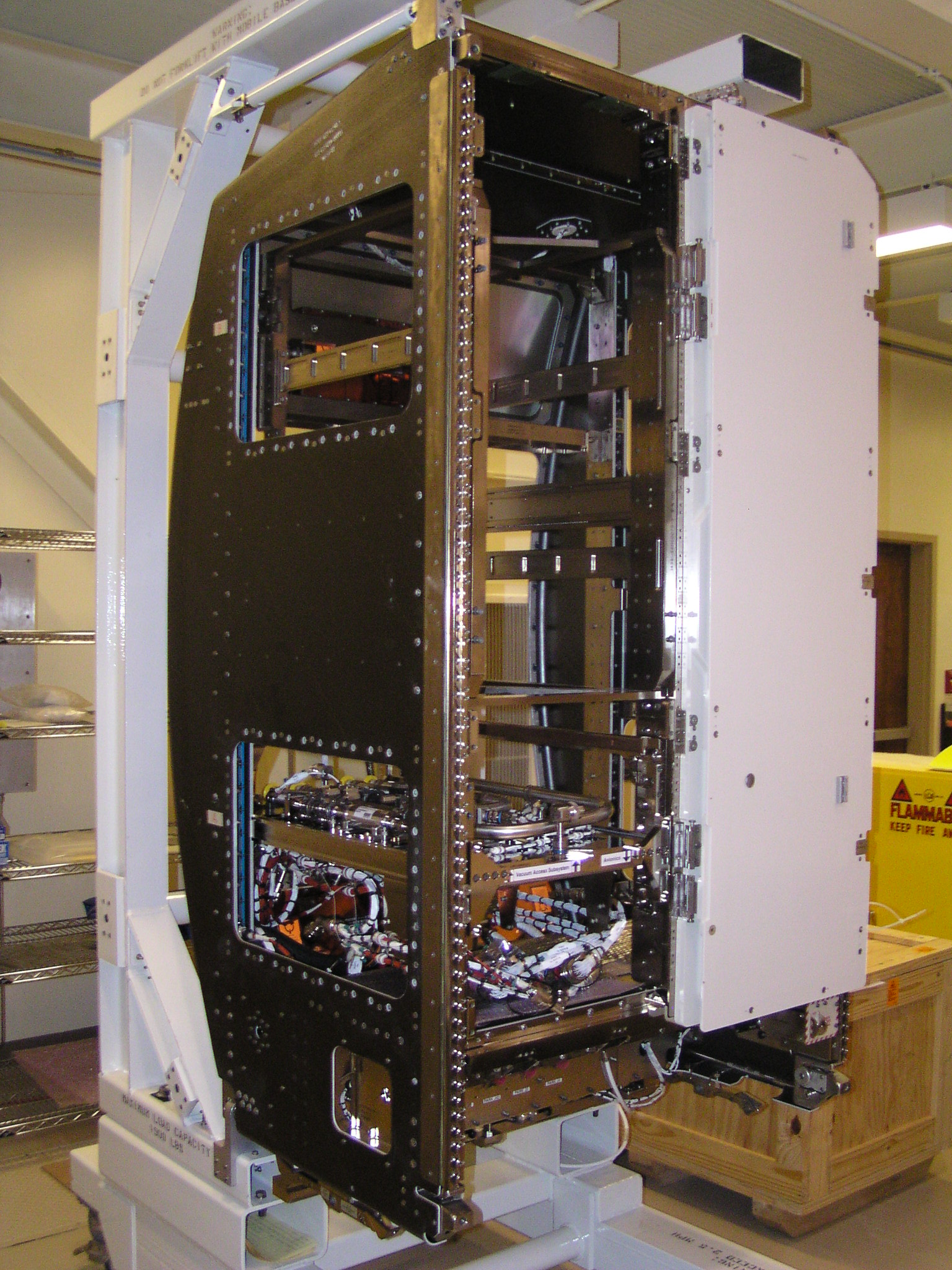
A close up view the Low Gradient Furnace (LGF) and Solidification and Quenching Furnace (SQF) developed by the European Space Agency located on the right side of the MSRR-1.

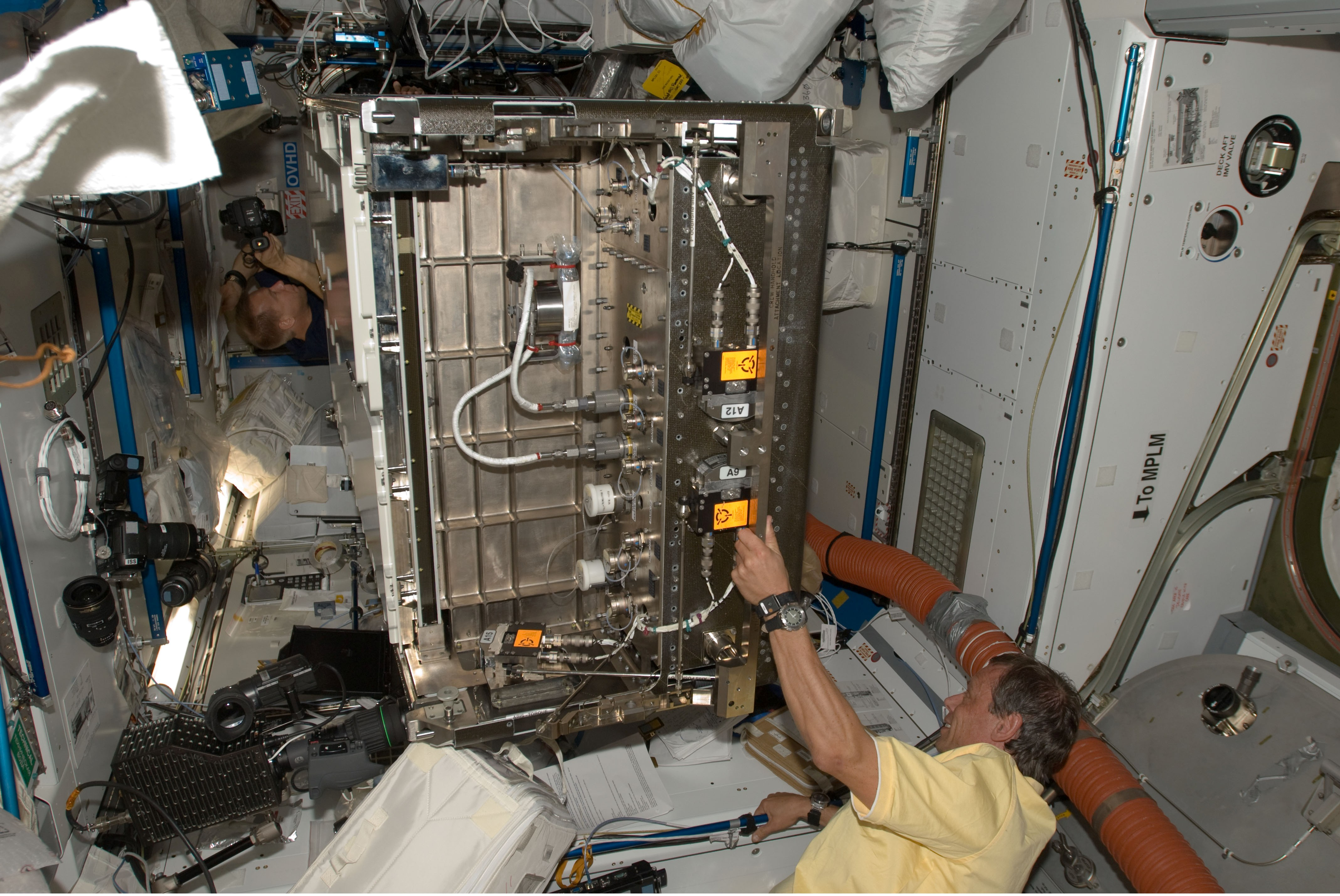
NASA Image: ISS020E037829 European Space Agency astronaut Christer Fuglesang (top foreground) and NASA astronaut Tim Kopra, both STS-128 mission specialists, install a Materials Science Research Rack-1 (MSRR-1) in the Destiny laboratory of the International Space Station
