= Merlin (disambiguation) =

Merlin is a Welsh wizard in Arthurian legend.

Merlin may also refer to:

== Arts and entertainment ==
=== Film and television ===
- Mr. Merlin, a 1981–82 American sitcom
- Merlin, a 1993 film starring Richard Lynch
- Merlin (miniseries), a 1998 NBC miniseries starring Sam Neill
- Merlin: The Quest Begins, a 1998 TV film featuring Jason Connery
- Merlin: The Return, a 2000 British fantasy film
- Merlin's Apprentice, a 2006 miniseries; sequel to 1998 miniseries Merlin starring Sam Neill
- Merlin (2008 TV series), also known as The Adventures of Merlin, a BBC One series starring Colin Morgan and Bradley James
- Merlin (2018 film), an Indian Tamil film

=== Fictional characters ===
- Merlin (Disney), a wizard in the 1963 animated film The Sword in the Stone
- Merlin (DC Comics), a half-demon sorcerer
- Merlin (Marvel Comics), the name of several characters
- Merlin, a caster-class servant in the 2019 anime television series Fate/Grand Order – Absolute Demonic Front: Babylonia
- Merlin (The Seven Deadly Sins), a witch in the 2012 manga series The Seven Deadly Sins
- Merlin the Magician (character), a Quality Comics character
- Myrddin Wyllt, also known as Merlin Sylvestris, a figure in medieval Welsh legend

=== Video gaming ===
- Merlin (console), a handheld electronic game by Parker Brothers
- Merlin (video game), a 2000 Game Boy Color game by RFX Interactive

=== Literature ===
- Merlin, a pen name used by poet Alfred, Lord Tennyson (1809–1892)
- Merlin (literary magazine), published in Paris between 1952 and 1954
- Merlin (Robert de Boron poem), by Robert de Boron
- Merlin (Robinson poem), a dramatic narrative poem by Edwin Arlington Robinson
- Merlin, a novel by Robert Nye
- Mary Stewart's Merlin Trilogy, a novel series

=== Music ===
- Merlin (Albéniz), English-language opera by Isaac Albéniz
- Merlin (Goldmark), German-language opera by Karl Goldmark 1886
- Merlin (musical), a 1983 Broadway musical
- Merlin (Yugoslav band), a Yugoslav pop rock band led by Dino Merlin
- Merlin (metal band), a Russian death metal band
- Merlin (rapper), a 1980s/90s UK hip hop artist
- Merlin Network, a nonprofit organization for independent music
- Merlin (Kayak album), a 1981 album by the Dutch progressive rock band Kayak
  - Merlin – Bard of the Unseen (2003), a new version of side 1 of the above album
- Merlin Rhys-Jones, guitarist and lyricist on the Ian Dury and the Blockheads album Mr. Love Pants
- Merlin (Merlin album), by Merlin

== Places ==
- Merlin, Ontario, Canada, a small farming community
- Merlin, California, US, an unincorporated community
- Merlin, Oregon, US, an unincorporated community
- Merlin diamond mine, Australia
- 2598 Merlin, an asteroid

== People ==
- Merlin (given name)
- Merlin (surname)
- Merlin, a pen name used by poet Alfred, Lord Tennyson (1809–1892)

== Science and technology ==
=== Aerospace ===
- Rolls-Royce Merlin, a British WWII aircraft engine
- AgustaWestland AW101, Merlin, a military helicopter
- Blue Yonder Merlin, an ultralight airplane
- Hick Merlin, a 1936 British sailplane
- Merlin (rocket engine family), developed by SpaceX
- Miles Merlin, a 1930s British monoplane
- Seedwings Europe Merlin, an Austrian hang glider
- Swearingen Merlin, a business aircraft
- TechProAviation Merlin 100, Czech homebuilt aircraft

=== Biology ===
- Merlin (bird), a species of falcon
- Merlin (protein), a cytoskeletal protein
- Merlin Bird ID, a mobile app for bird identification

=== Computing and telecommunications ===
- Merlin (assembler), for Apple II and Commodore 64/128
- Merlin (database), of the Metropolitan Police Service
- Merlin M4000, a 1980s personal computer for businesses
- Merlin Tonto, a 1980s personal computer for businesses
- Manitoba Education, Research and Learning Information Networks (MERLIN), the provincial educational service provider in Manitoba, Canada
- Merlin, a Microsoft Office Office Assistant
- NetWare PalmDOS 1, codenamed Merlin
- AT&T Merlin, a telephone system
- IBM "Merlin" hard disk drives; see History of IBM magnetic disk drives § IBM 3330

=== Other uses in science and technology ===
- MERLIN, an array of radio telescopes
- Merlin, a brand of garage door openers, part of the Chamberlain Group
- MERLIN reactor, a nuclear reactor in the UK
- MERLIN (refrigerator), a storage freezer on the International Space Station
- Merlín the Duck, a Mexican duck seen during the 2026 World Cup

== Business ==
- Merlin Airways, US
- Merlin (bicycle company), US
- Merlin Entertainments, UK amusement park company
- Merlin Express, a Puerto Rico cargo airline
- Merlin Publishing, UK 1980s and 1990s sticker and card producer
- Project Merlin, UK banks and government agreement
- The Monmouthshire Merlin, a 19th-century Welsh newspaper competing with the Monmouthshire Beacon

== Royal Navy ==
- HMS Merlin, the name of several Royal Navy ships
- Merlin-class sloop, a class of Royal Navy wooden sloops built between 1743 and 1746

== Other ==
- Medical Emergency Relief International, a charity
- Operation Merlin, an alleged CIA covert operation in 2000 to thwart Iran's nuclear ambitions
- Crailsheim Merlins, a German professional basketball team
- AEC Merlin, type of single-deck bus used in London between 1966 and 1981

== See also ==
- Merlyn (disambiguation)
- Marlin
