= Merlyn (disambiguation) =

Merlyn is an alternate spelling of Merlin, a wizard in the Arthurian legend.

Merlyn may also refer to:

- Merlyn (cricket), an automated bowling machine used by the England cricket team
- Merlyn (DC Comics), a DC Comics supervillain and arch-rival of Green Arrow
- Merlyn (Marvel Comics), a supporting character of Marvel Comics' Captain Britain
- Merlyn (racing car), racing cars built by Colchester Racing Development (CRD)
- The Book of Merlyn, the posthumously published final book in T. H. White's The Once and Future King

== People ==
=== Men ===
- Merlyn Merl Condit (1917–1992), American professional football player
- Merlyn Dawson (born 1960), Belizean cyclist
- Merlyn Hans Dethlefsen (1934–1987), US Air Force officer and recipient of the Medal of Honor
- Bud Lea (1928–2021), American sportswriter
- Merlyn Phillips (1896–1978), Canadian professional ice hockey player
- Merlyn Rees (1920–2006), British politician
- Randal Schwartz (born 1961), or merlyn, American technology writer, system administrator and programming consultant
- Merlyn Orville Valan (1926–2010), American farmer and politician
- Merlyn Wood (born 1996), Ghanaian-American rapper and songwriter

=== Women ===
- Merlyn D'Souza (born 1961), Indian composer and pianist
- Merlyn Edwards, Trinidadian cricketer
- Merlyn Lowther (born 1954), Chief Cashier of the Bank of England from 1999 to 2003
- Merlyn Mantle (1932–2009), American writer and wife of baseball player Mickey Mantle
- Merlyn Myer (1900–1982), Australian philanthropist
- Merlyn Severn (1897–1973), English photographer
- Merlyn Sopjan (born 1973), Indonesian transgender rights activist

== See also ==
- Merlin (disambiguation)
