= GLACIER (refrigerator) =

GLACIER (General Laboratory Active Cryogenic ISS Experiment Refrigerator) is a double middeck locker equivalent payload designed to provide thermal control between +4 °C and -160 °C, store scientific samples on ISS in the EXpedite the PRocessing of Experiments to Space Station (EXPRESS) rack, and transport samples to and from orbit via the SpaceX Dragon or Cygnus spacecraft. Designed and developed by University of Alabama at Birmingham (UAB) Center for Biophysical Sciences and Engineering (CBSE) for NASA Cold Stowage, Glacier was originally designed for use on board the Space Shuttle.

== Development ==
In 2002 NASA began development of several spaceflight cold stowage systems to work in conjunction with the large (ISS Rack sized) ESA MELFI and Cryosystem freezers. One of these was for a system capable of rapidly freezing bagged irregularly shaped science samples to below -160°C in as fast as 1°C/min for a 100ml sample, being able to maintain a complement of frozen samples without electrical power for several hours, and to be of a compact double middeck locker format, to enable transfer between the ISS and the Space Shuttle Orbiter cabin for transport to/from orbit. The combination of these goals presented several significant technical challenges, and prompted NASA to implement a two-phase development approach. In the first phase, two competing designs were matured through Preliminary Design Review (PDR) and completed functional demonstration of key freezer components. In the second phase one of the designs was then developed through to the completed flight freezers. NASA awarded a contract to UAB CBSE to build the GLACIER freezer system in 2005. The first GLACIER freezers flew on STS-126 in 2008.

== Description ==
- GLACIER can use air or water to reject heat depending on the temperatures required for the scientific samples.
- GLACIER can maintain temperatures from +4 to -95 °C using only air cooling, and can cool to -160 °C when connected to the water supply.
- GLACIER's pump creates a low vacuum within the cool box in order to improve electrical and cooling efficiency.
- GLACIER can accommodate up to 36 lb of sample mass.

== Additional Cold Storage ==
GLACIER is one of multiple units available for storage on the ISS and/or transportation to and from the ISS.

- Minus Eighty Degree Laboratory Freezer for ISS (MELFI)
  - +4 °C to -80 °C
- MERLIN (Microgravity Experiment Research Locker/ Incubator)
  - +48 °C to -20 °C
- Polar (Research Refrigerator for ISS)
  - +4 °C to -95 °C

== See also ==
- Scientific research on the ISS
- International Space Station
- SpaceX Dragon
