= Polar (refrigerator) =

Polar is a research refrigerator designed and developed by University of Alabama at Birmingham (UAB) Center for Biophysical Sciences and Engineering (CBSE) for NASA Cold Stowage. Polar was designed as a single mid-deck locker equivalent payload to store scientific samples on-board ISS and in transport to/from ISS via SpaceX Dragon or Cygnus spacecraft. Polar operates between 4 and −95 °C (39 and −139 °F).

== Description ==
- Polar is mounted in the ISS on the EXpedite the PRocessing of Experiments to Space Station (EXPRESS) rack.
- Polar can maintain temperatures ranging from 4 to −95 °C (39 to −139 °F).
- Polar is air-cooled via rear-air fan.

== Additional Cold Stowage ==
Polar is one of multiple units available for storage on the ISS and/or transportation to and from the ISS. Others include:

- Minus Eighty Degree Laboratory Freezer for ISS (MELFI)
  - 4 to −80 °C (39 to −112 °F)
- MERLIN (Microgravity Experiment Research Locker/ Incubator)
  - 48 to −20 °C (118 to −4 °F)
- GLACIER (General Laboratory Active Cryogenic ISS Experiment Refrigerator)
  - 4 to −160 °C (39 to −256 °F)

== See also ==
- Scientific research on the ISS
- International Space Station
- SpaceX Dragon
