= Minus Eighty Degree Laboratory Freezer for ISS =

Experiment storage freezer for the ISS

The Minus Eighty-Degree Laboratory Freezer for ISS (MELFI) is a European-built experiment storage freezer for the International Space Station. It comprises four independent dewars, which can be set to operate at different temperatures. Currently temperatures of −80 °C, −26 °C, and +4 °C are used during in-orbit ISS operations. Both reagents and samples are stored in the freezer. As well as storage, the freezer is designed to transport samples to and from the ISS in a temperature-controlled environment. The total capacity of the unit is 300 litres.

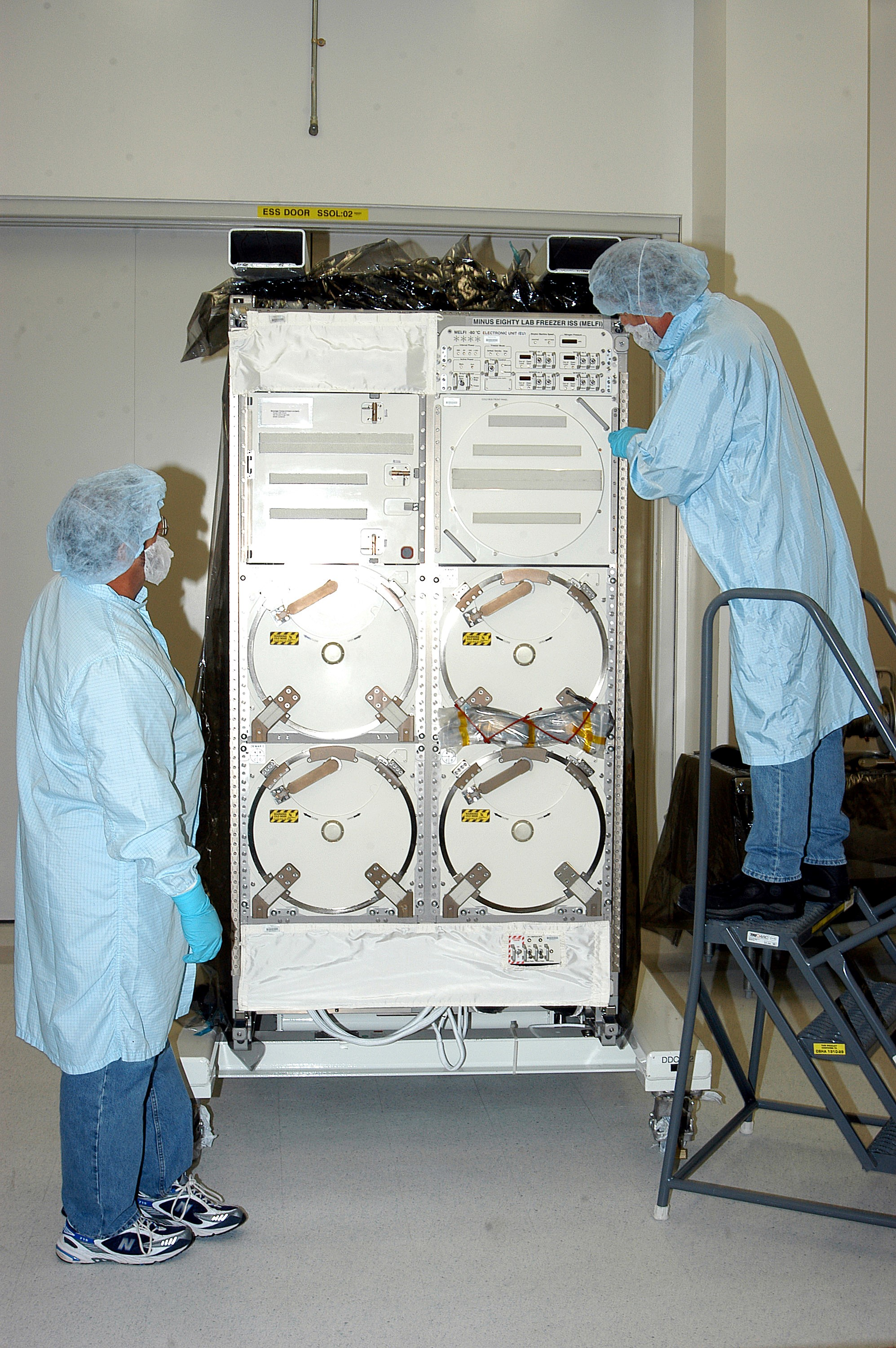
Minus Eighty-Degree Laboratory Freezer for ISS

== History ==
The first MELFI unit, FU-1, was flown to the station in 2006 on Space Shuttle mission STS-121, installed in the Destiny Laboratory Module, and commissioned by Thomas Reiter.

The MELFI flight units were originally designed to be flown fully powered in the Multi-Purpose Logistics Module, permitting pre-made experiments to be flown to the station without contaminating or destroying any samples.

The plan was to cycle the three MELFI units between orbit and Earth.

The final MELFI unit was flown to the ISS on board Space Shuttle Discovery during the STS-131 mission in 2010.

== MELFI description ==
Dewars are cylindrical, 75-liter vacuum-insulated containers that may hold samples of various sizes and forms. A number of extra dewars were also delivered with the unit at first. The cooling system for the MELFI is based on the Reverse Brayton Thermodynamic Cycle which uses nitrogen as a working fluid.

MELFI was developed by the European Space Agency. Two units have been supplied to NASA and one to the Japan Aerospace Exploration Agency (JAXA). In addition ground units for training, experiment preparation, and use in control experiments have been built.

- Weight: 730 kg (1609 pounds)
- Design lifetime: 10 years.

== Additional cold storage ==
Additional cold storage and transportation options available are listed below:

- MERLIN (Microgravity Experiment Research Locker/ Incubator)
  - +48 °C to -20 °C
- GLACIER (General Laboratory Active Cryogenic ISS Experiment Refrigerator)
  - +4 °C to –160 °C
- Polar (Research Refrigerator for ISS)
  - (+4 °C to -95 °C)

== See also ==
- Scientific research on the ISS
- International Standard Payload Rack
- International Space Station
- STS-121

== Gallery ==
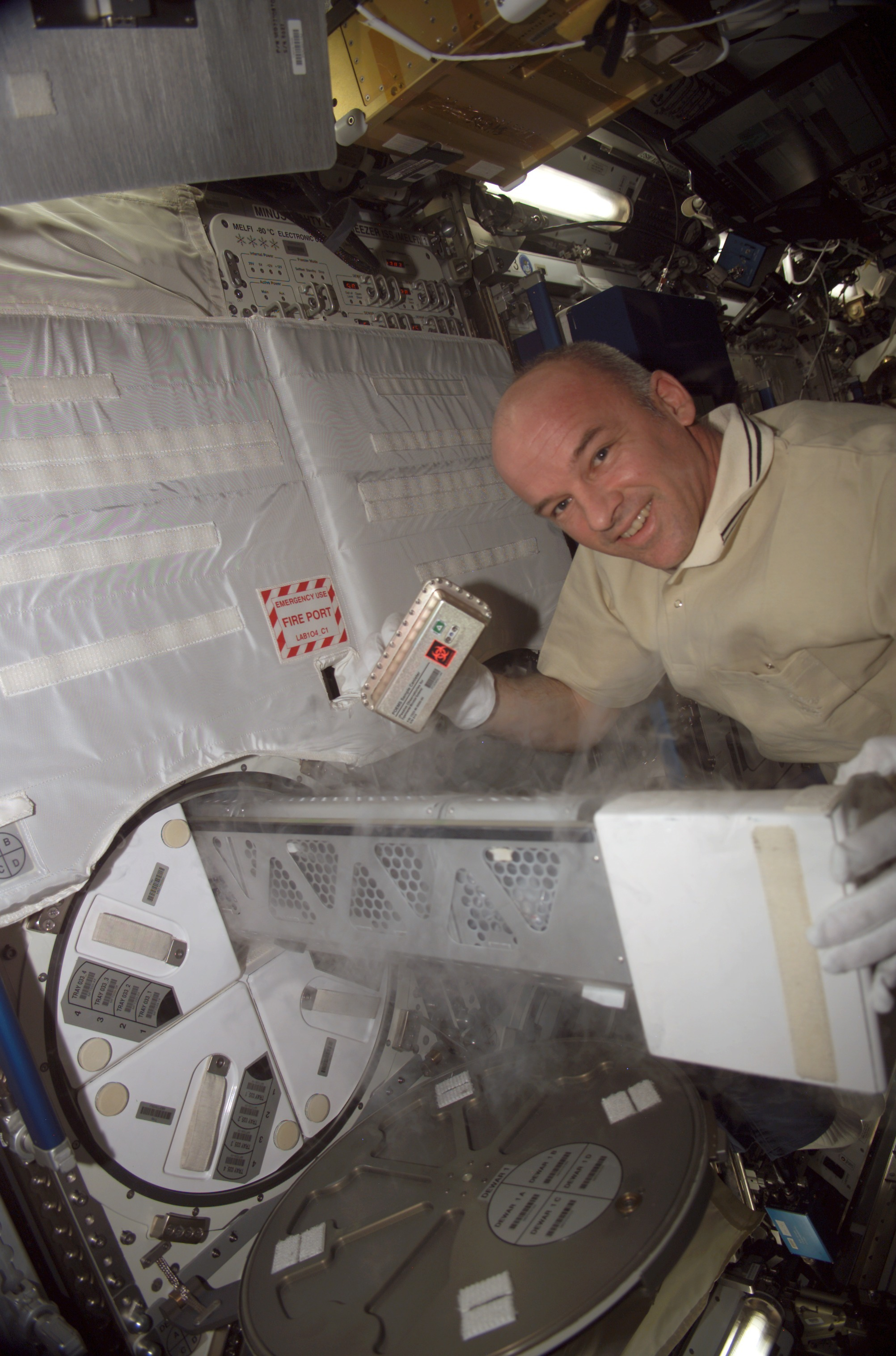
NASA Image: ISS013E64641- Astronaut Jeff Williams, Expedition 13 ISS Science Officer, places a POEMS sample into the MELFI freezer (Minus Eighty Laboratory Freezer for ISS).

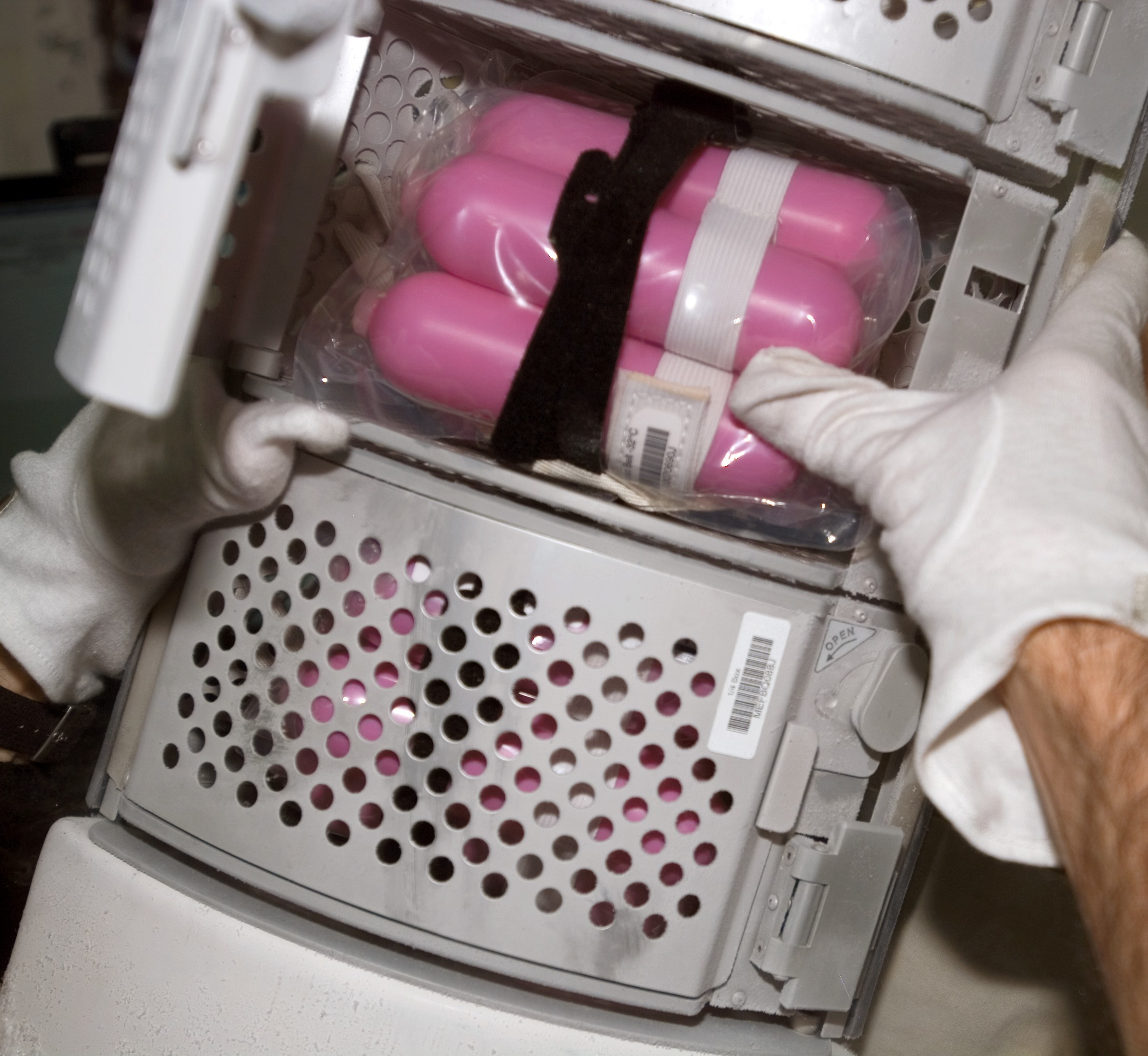
NASA Images: ISS014E13005 - Expedition 14 Commander, Astronaut Michael E. Lopez-Alegria, inserts ISS Cold Enclosure PCM Augmenting Capsules (ICEPACs) into the MELFI in the Destiny laboratory module.

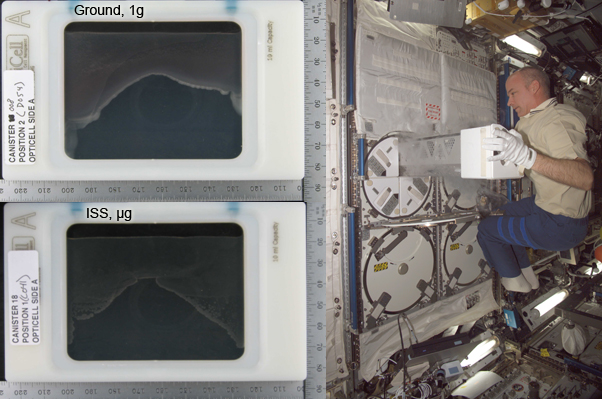
NASA Image: ISS013E64639 - Image on the right shows NASA ISS Science Officer, Jeff Williams inserting one of the POEMS samples into the MELFI freezer. Image on the left shows ground control and a flight sample of bacteria cultures growing through the solid media agar, and scientists can sample the genetic changes across multiple generations by sampling different places in the growth medium.

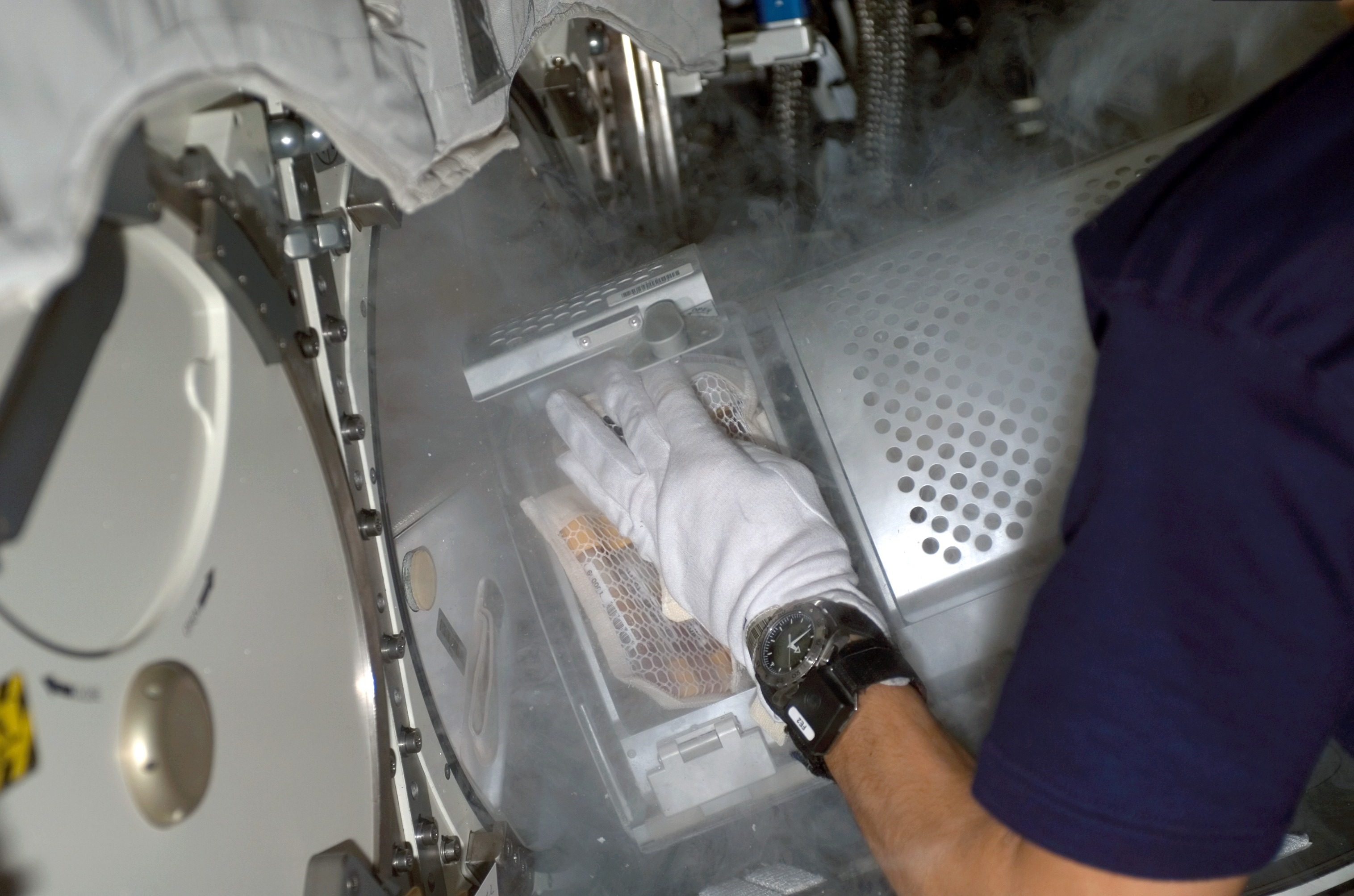
NASA Image ISS015E10573 View of Expedition 15 astronaut and Flight Engineer (FE-2), Sunita Williams, inserting blood samples into the MELFI for the Nutritional Status Assessment (Nutrition) experiment to help understand human physiologic changes during long-duration space flight. Photo was taken in the U.S. Laboratory/Destiny.

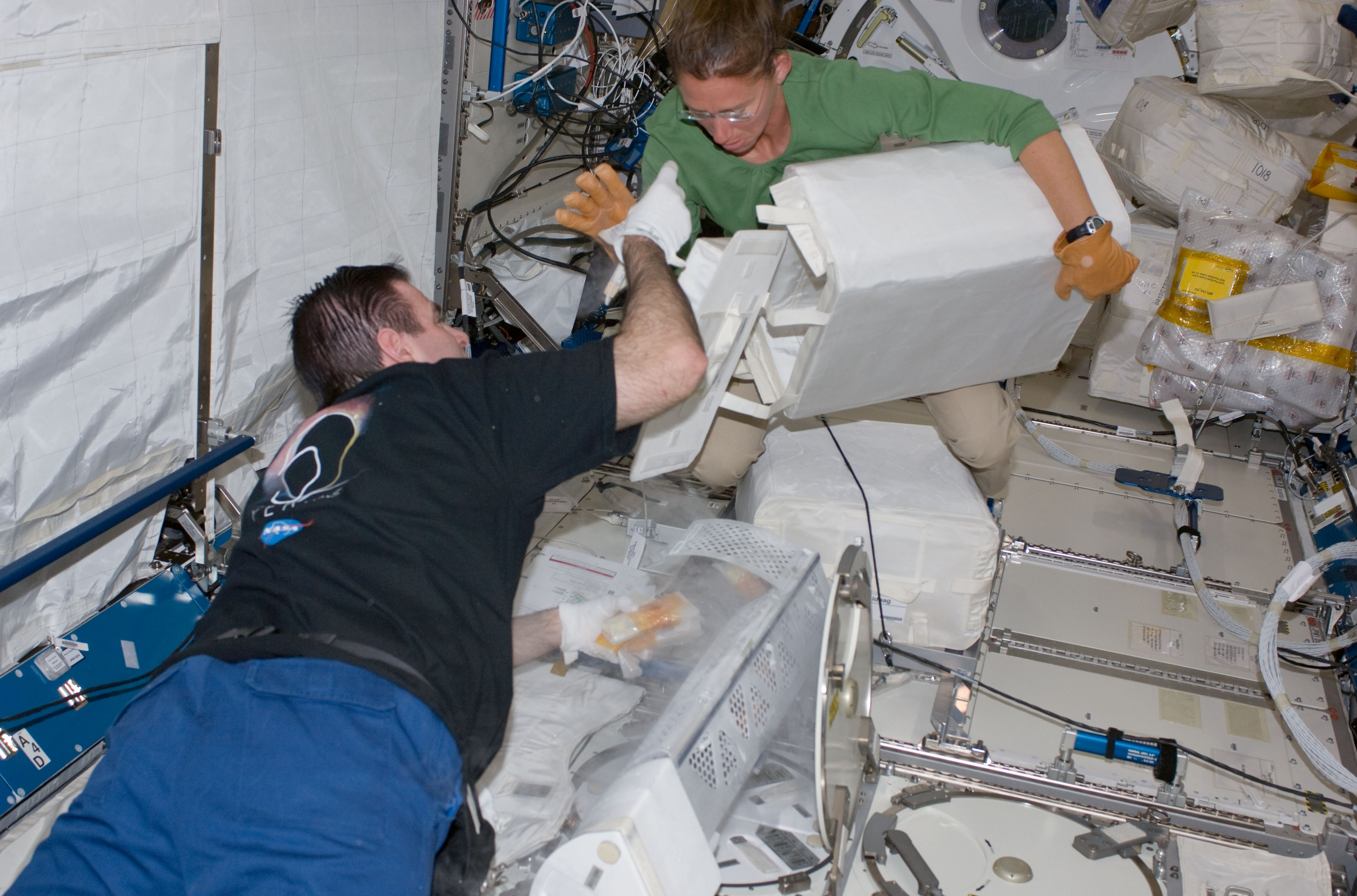
NASA Image: S126E008593 - Mission Specialist Greg Chamitoff and Expedition 18 Flight Engineer Sandra Magnus conduct a sample transfer from the General Laboratory Active Cryogenic ISS Experiment Refrigerator (GLACIER) to Minus Eighty Degree Laboratory Freezer For ISS (MELFI). Image was taken in the Japanese Experiment Module (JEM), Kibo during joint operations between Expedition 18 and STS-126/ULF2.

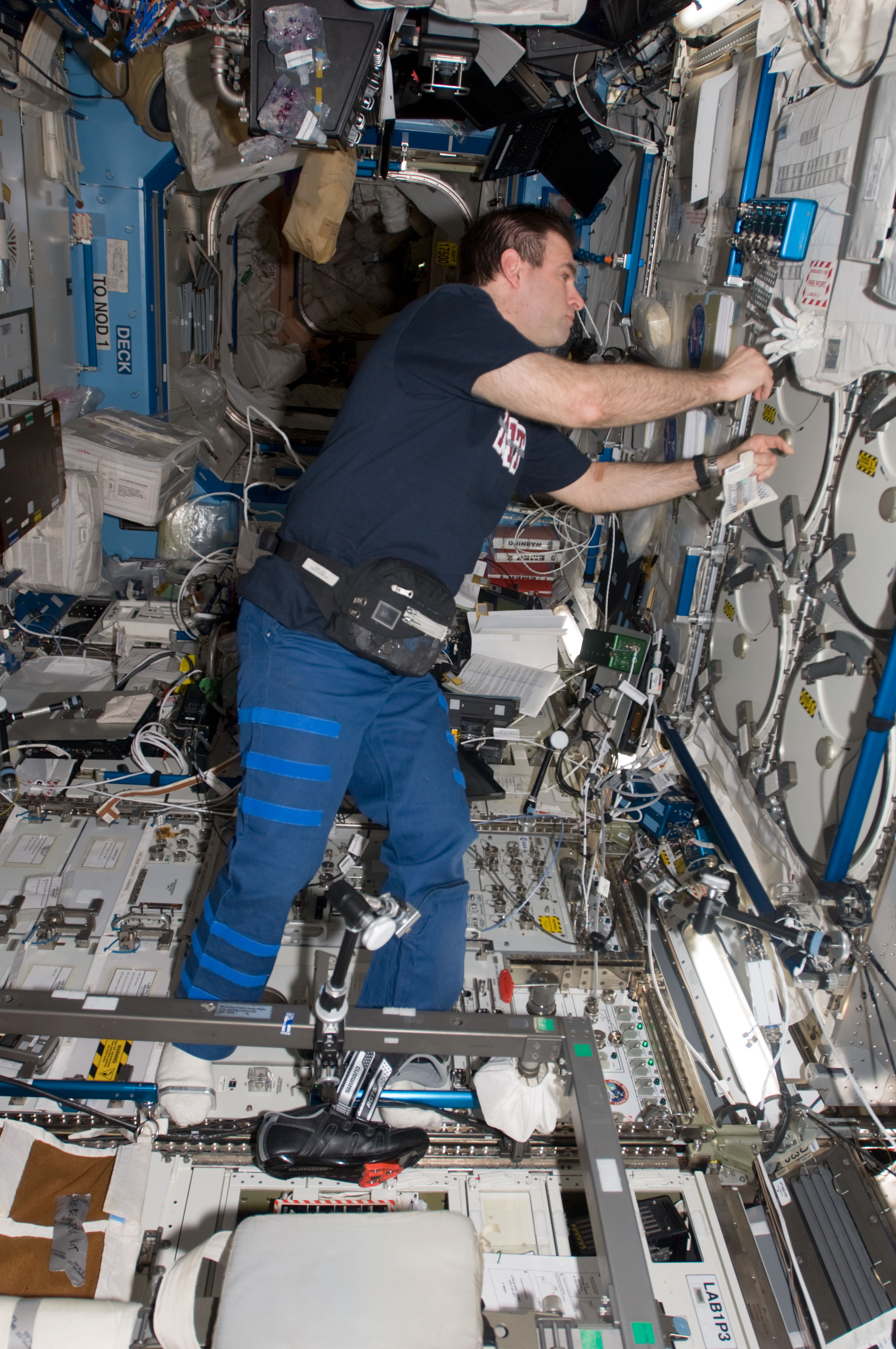
NASA Image: ISS017E017539 - NASA astronaut Greg Chamitoff, Expedition 17 flight engineer, works with the Minus Eighty Degree Laboratory Freezer for ISS (MELFI) as part of the Nutritional Status Assessment (Nutrition) experiment in the Destiny laboratory of the International Space Station.

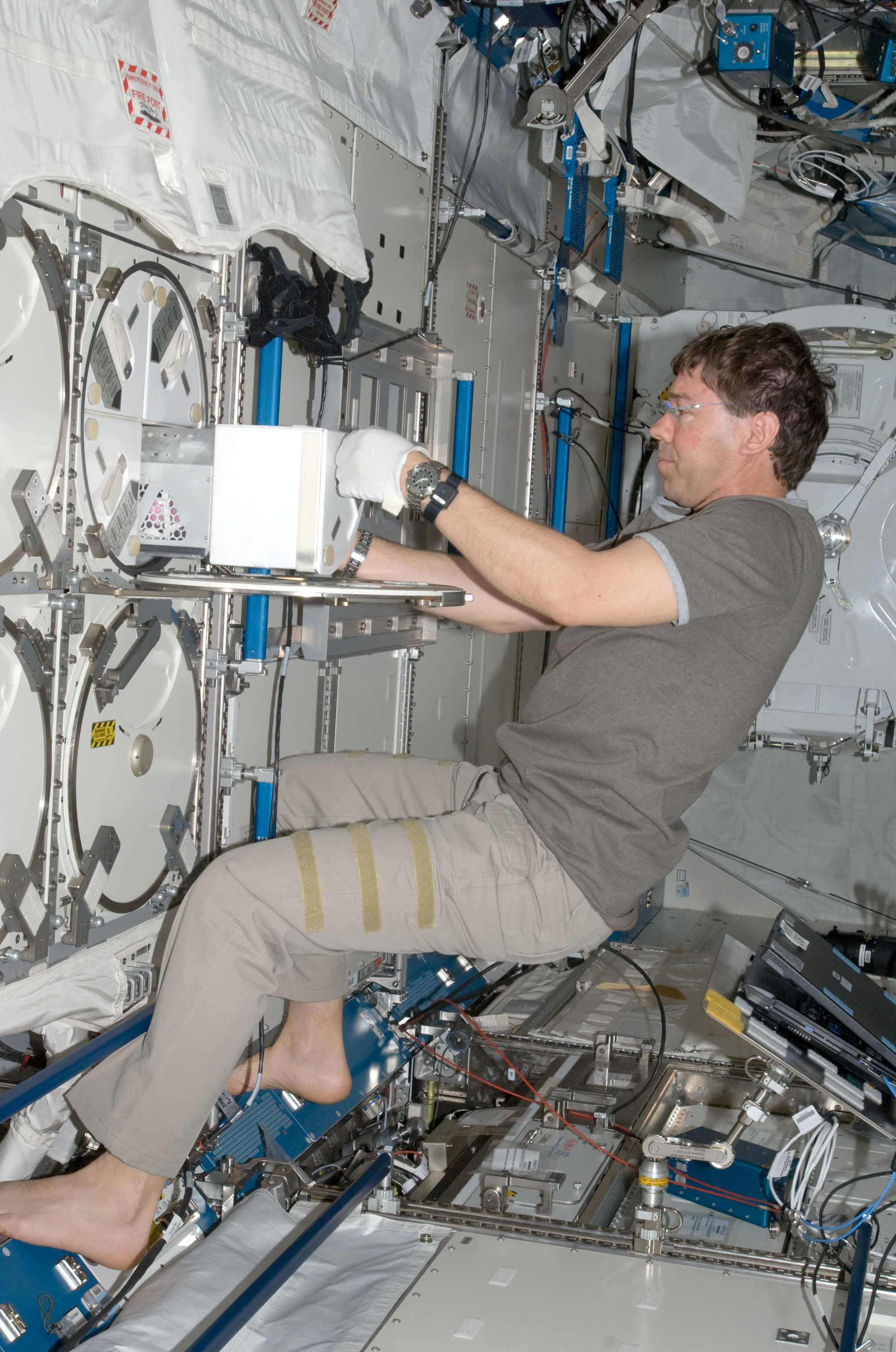
NASA Image: ISS019E005715 (11 April 2009) Astronaut Michael Barratt, Expedition 19/20 flight engineer, performs an insertion of urine samples into the Minus Eighty Degree Laboratory Freezer for ISS (MELFI) as part of the Nutritional Status Assessment (NUTRITION) study in the Japanese Kibo laboratory of the International Space Station.

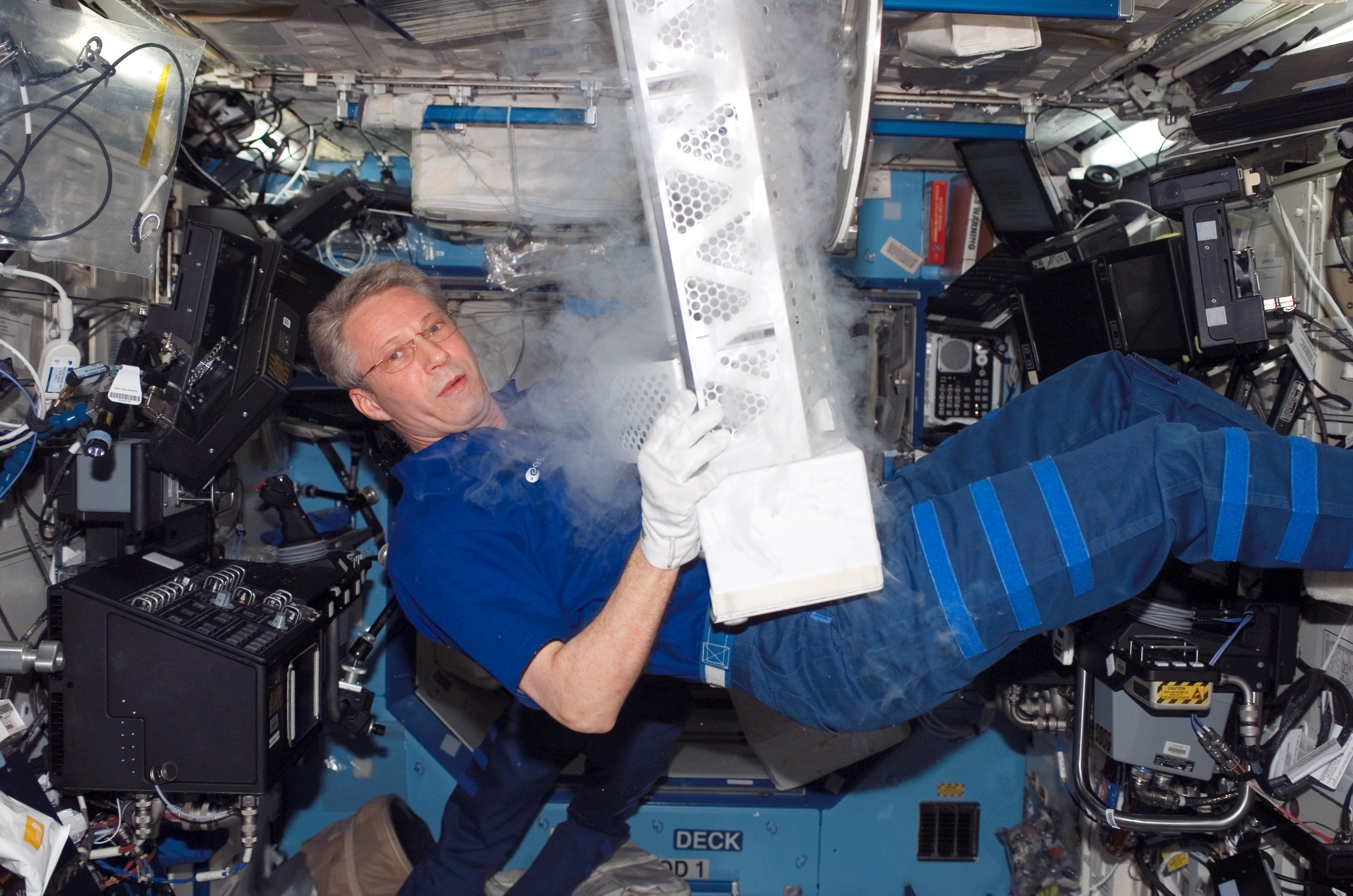
NASA Image: S116E07446: European Space Agency (ESA) astronaut Thomas Reiter, STS-116 mission specialist, works with the Passive Observatories for Experimental Microbial Systems in Micro-G (POEMS) payload in the Minus Eighty Degree Laboratory Freezer for ISS (MELFI) in the Destiny laboratory of the International Space Station while Space Shuttle Discovery was docked with the station.

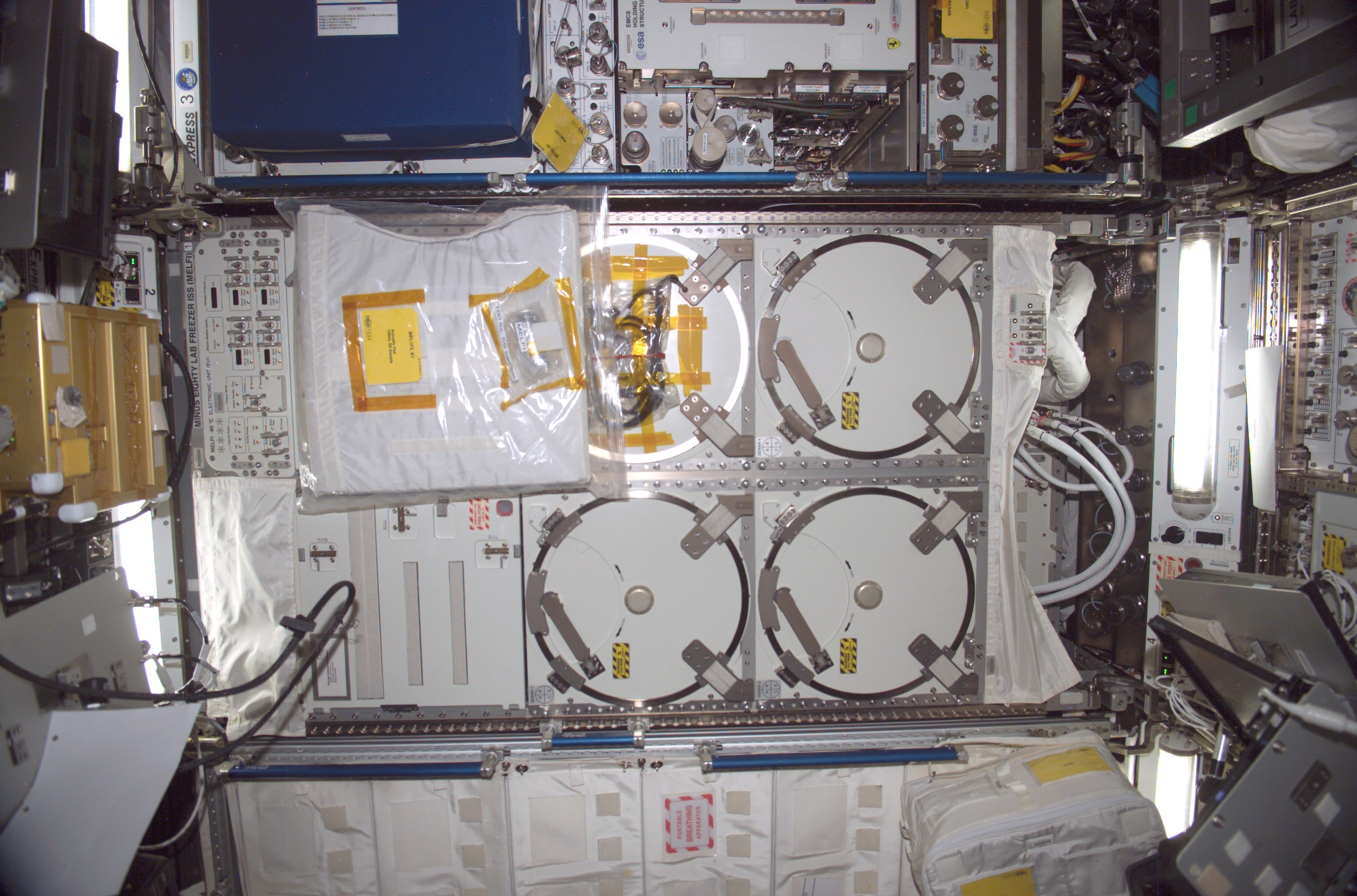
NASA Image: ISS013E51695 - MELFI after installation on the International Space Station during Expedition 13.

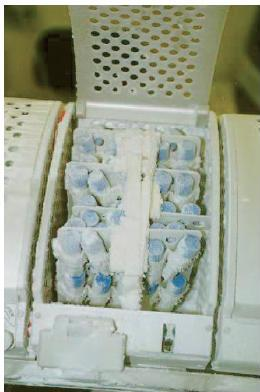
A one-fourth size standard box module for MELFI, full of standard vial cards with frozen samples.

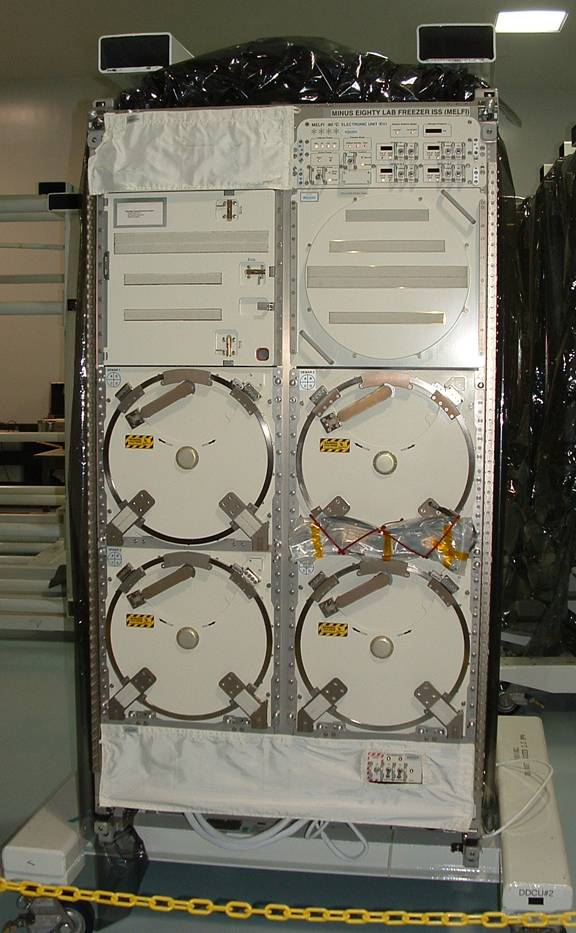
NASA Image: JSC2003e00730 - Minus Eighty Degree Laboratory Freezer for ISS (MELFI) before launch to ISS.

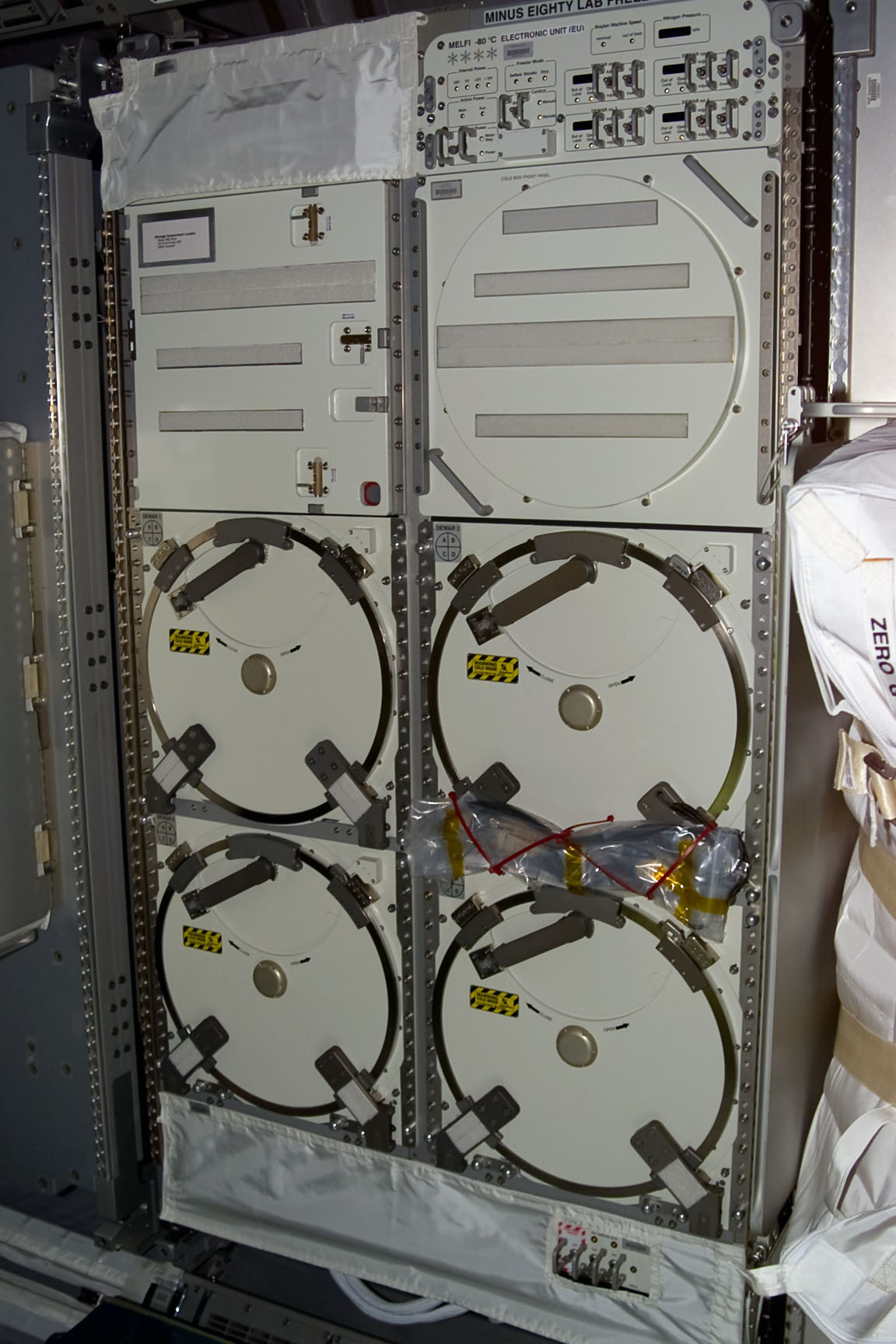
NASA Image: JSC2008e157029 - Minus Eighty Degree Laboratory Freezer for ISS (MELFI) before launch to ISS.
