= Merlin (video game) =

2000 video game

- Cover art
- Developer: RFX Interactive
- Publishers: Light & Shadow Production; Electronic Arts
- Platform: Game Boy Color
- Release: December 2000
- Genre: Action
- Mode: Single-player

Merlin is a 2000 action game for the Game Boy Color developed by French company RFX Interactive, published in Europe by Light & Shadow Production and Electronic Arts. The game is a platformer that takes place in a fantasy setting inspired by the mythical figure Merlin.

== Gameplay ==
A screenshot of Merlin, displaying the game's 'magic' system.

Merlin is an action game and platformer in which the player must navigate levels whilst defeating enemies. The game features five worlds each comprising three levels, based on the elements of Earth, Water, Fire and Air, and the human world. Worlds alternate between action-based and platforming-based levels, with a miniboss featured in each level and final boss at the end of each world. Merlin's life system is measured by a 'magic meter', which increases when defeating enemies, and decreases when being hit. When the meter is full, or when Merlin picks up a power-up, he is able to cast different spells.

== Reception ==
Reception

Review scores
Publication	Score
Computer and Video Games	4/5
Game Boy Xtreme	70%
Total Game Boy	54%
64 Magazine	71%

Merlin received mixed to negative reviews, with most criticism expressing frustration with the control system and difficulty of the game. In a positive review, Computer and Video Games stated that "Merlin is a joy to play", citing the "variation in challenges, neat little touches and awesome boss battles", although conceding that being unable to move in the air while falling was an "annoying quirk" of the controls. 64 Magazine critiqued the controls as "the worst thing about this game", stating "the responsiveness, or lack of it, means that tapping jump more often than not results in a mistimed leap". Total Game Boy dismissed Merlin as a "below-average platformer with almost nothing to offer", particularly critiquing the "clumsy" controls. Game Boy Xtreme found that the game was "visually appealing", but "too short and samey".
