= Bud Lea =

American sportswriter (1928–2021)

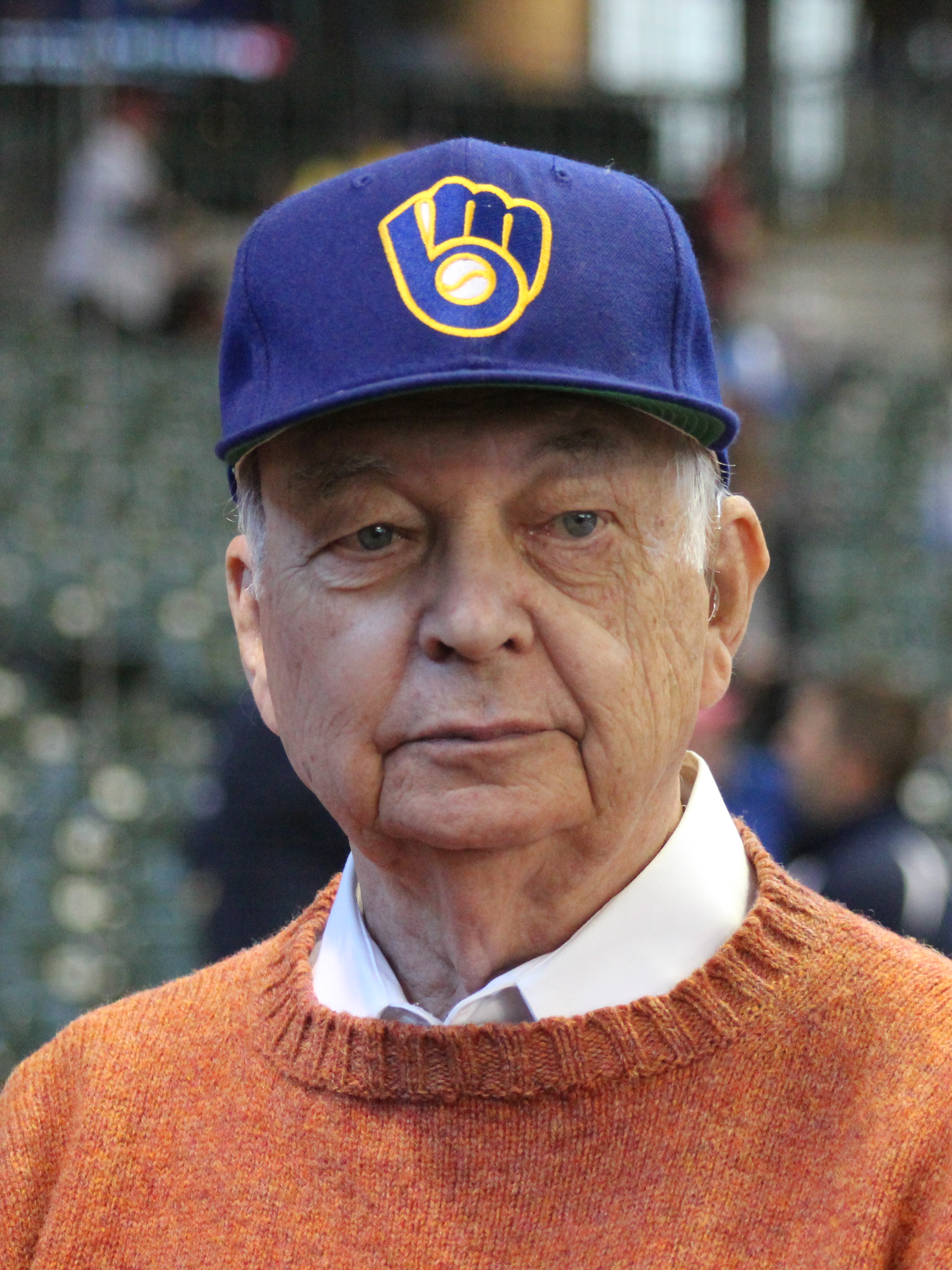
- Lea in 2015
- Born: Merlyn Lea; December 6, 1928; Green Bay, Wisconsin, U.S.
- Died: January 20, 2021 (aged 92); Mequon, Wisconsin, U.S.
- Occupation: Sportswriter

Merlyn "Bud" Lea (December 6, 1928 – January 20, 2021) was an American sportswriter who was noted for covering Wisconsin sports. Lea, a native of Green Bay, Wisconsin, attended Green Bay West High School and then the University of Wisconsin–Madison. He began his reporting career in college, where he wrote for the school newspaper, The Daily Cardinal. After college, he was hired by the Post-Bulletin in Rochester, Minnesota, before being hired by the Milwaukee Sentinel in 1953. Lea's association with the Sentinel lasted over 55 years and included roles as a beat reporter of the Green Bay Packers, the newspaper's sports editor and a columnist. Lea died in 2021 at the age of 92.

== Early life ==
Bud Lea was born on December 6, 1928, in Green Bay, Wisconsin. He grew up on the west side of Green Bay and attended Green Bay West High School. His twin sister, Marilyn, coined his nickname "Bud". As a child, he attended Green Bay Packers games with his father at City Stadium. After high school, he attended the University of Wisconsin–Madison, where he wrote for the school's newspaper, The Daily Cardinal. Near the end of his time at university, he was diagnosed with ulcerative colitis; doctors recommended against becoming a newspaper journalist because of the stress of having to meet daily deadlines.

== Journalism career ==
After college, Lea got a job with the Post-Bulletin in Rochester, Minnesota. In 1953, he joined the Milwaukee Sentinel in the sports department. He was given the Packers beat in 1954 when none of his colleagues expressed a desire for it. He covered the Packers beat for 19 years before being promoted to the newspaper's sports editor. Even as sports editor, he still covered the Packers with a recurring column. Lea retired from the Sentinel in the mid-1990s after it merged with the Milwaukee Journal. After retirement, he continued writing for Packers Plus, a magazine owned by the Milwaukee Journal Sentinel focused on the Packers, for over a decade. In addition to the Packers, Lea also covered other local sports, including the Milwaukee Braves (who would later move to Atlanta, Georgia, retaining their name). Lea had a notable relationship with Bud Selig, who was part owner of the Braves at the time, future owner of the Milwaukee Brewers and the future Commissioner of Baseball. Lea helped form the Milwaukee Braves Historical Association to document the team's history in Milwaukee.

During his time covering the Packers, Lea witnessed some of the most and least successful periods of the team's history. When he began in the late 1950s, the Packers were one of the worst teams in the NFL, culminating in the team's 1–10–1 record in the 1959 NFL season, the worst ever by total wins and winning percentage. However, he also saw the hiring of Vince Lombardi, who would go on to lead the team to five NFL championships in the 1960s. This included the famous 1967 NFL Championship Game, known as the "Ice Bowl", which Lea attended and witnessed Bart Starr score the winning touchdown at the end of the game on a quarterback sneak. Lea continued covering the Packers in the post-Lombardi years, when the team saw another sustained period of poor on-field performances, and in the 1990s and early 2000s, when Brett Favre helped lead the Packers to their first championship since the Lombardi era. For his entire career, Lea covered over 30 Super Bowls for the Sentinel.

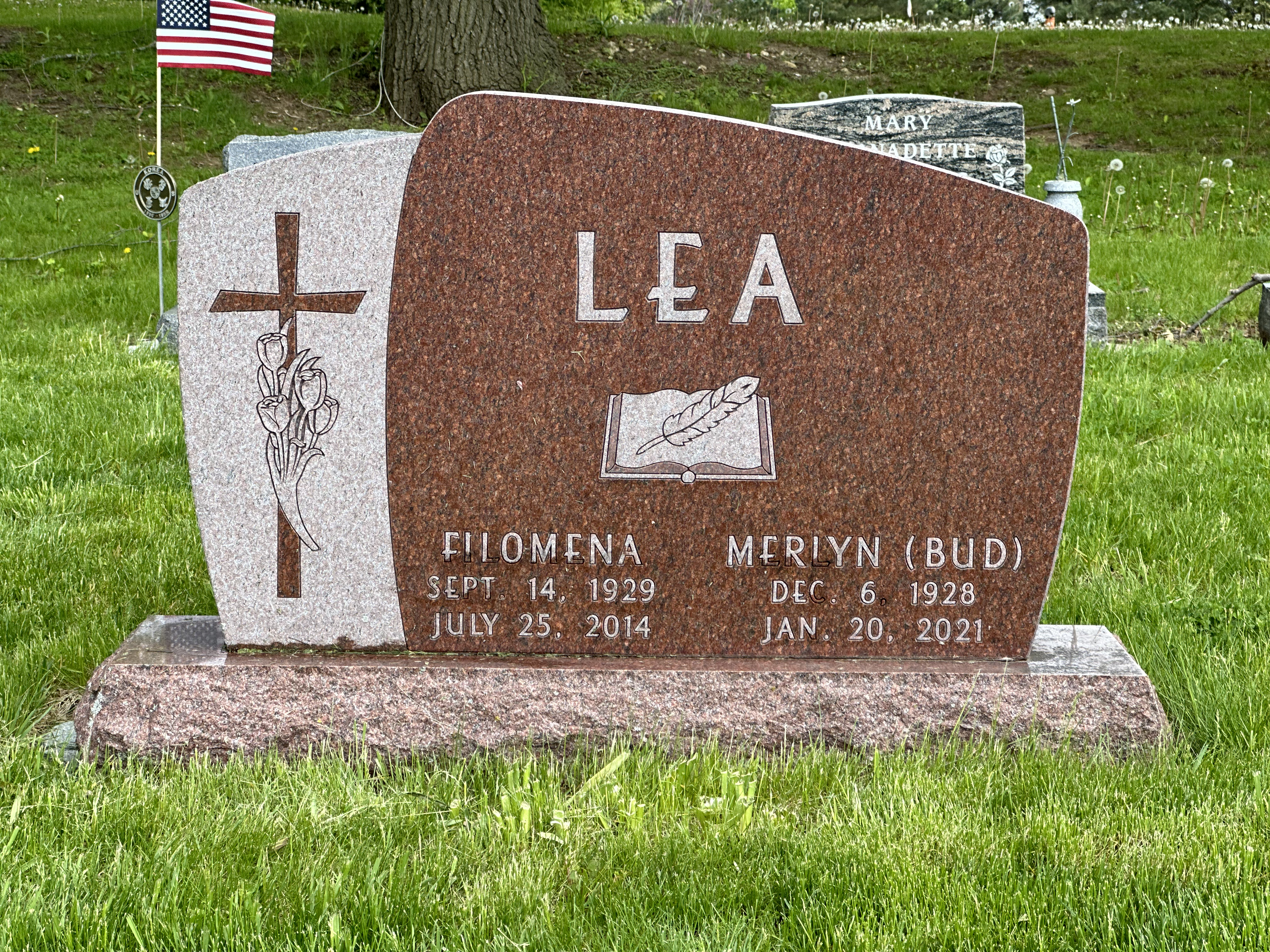
Bud Lea's headstone at St Mary of the Hill in Hartford Wisconsin

Lea was well-respected by his colleagues and Packers executives, including Lombardi, Bob Harlan, Cliff Christl and Mark Murphy. He noted that Lombardi was the most challenging person he covered, often providing short answers or not answering at all, although Christl noted that Lombardi read Lea's coverage of the Packers "religiously". Christl later stated that "Lea was known for his thorough, objective and aggressive coverage of the team". In 1987, the National Sportscasters and Sportswriters Association named Lea the Wisconsin sportswriter of the year. In 2002, Lea wrote Magnificent Seven: The Championship Games That Built the Lombardi Dynasty, a book about the Lombardi era. Two years later, he was inducted into the Milwaukee Press Club's Media Hall of Fame. At various times in his career, Lea served as a selector or alternate selector for the Pro Football Hall of Fame, the Green Bay Packers Hall of Fame and the Wisconsin Athletic Hall of Fame. In 2020, the Packers Hall of Fame created the annual Bud Lea Media Award. The first award was given to Lea posthumously in 2022 after the COVID-19 pandemic delayed the ceremony for over a year.

== Personal life ==
While working at the Sentinel, Lea met Filomena Volpintesta. Filomena wrote a column on interior design within the women's department at the newspaper. The two married in 1957 and had two sons. Filomena died in 2014. Lea contracted COVID-19 near the end of 2020 but recovered. He died on January 20, 2021, at the age of 92.
