= MERLIN (refrigerator) =

Spacecraft equipment

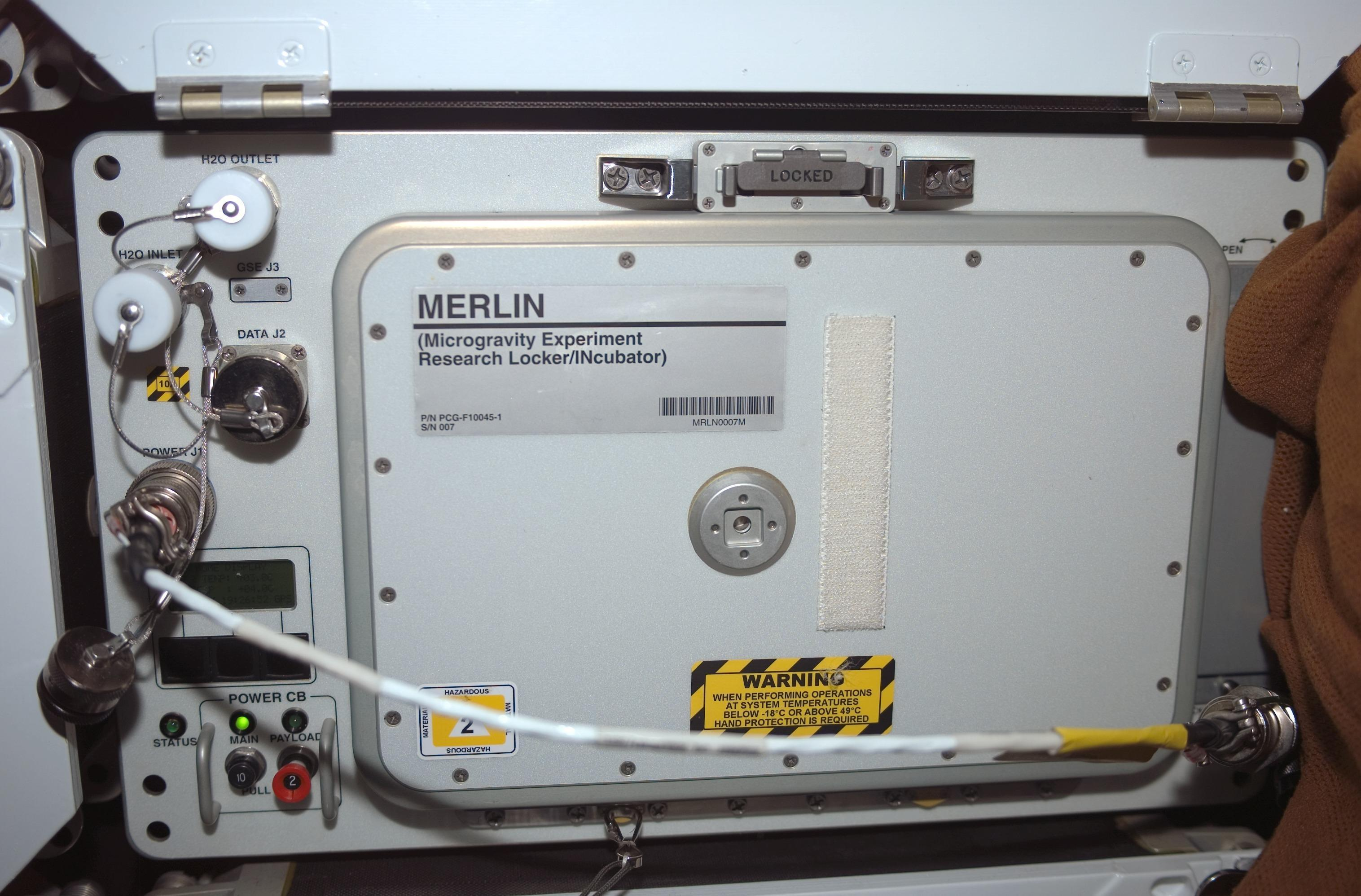
A MERLIN from NASA

Microgravity Experiment Research Locker/Incubator (MERLIN) was designed by University of Alabama at Birmingham (UAB) Center for Biophysical Sciences and Engineering (CBSE) to operate as a hardmounted, single middeck locker equivalent within the ISS EXPRESS rack, the Space Shuttle, SpaceX Dragon, and Cygnus (spacecraft) . It is used to provide a temperature controlled environment for scientific experiments between -20 °C and 48.5 °C. MERLIN is also used to Support Crew Galley Operations.

== Description ==
- MERLIN is cooled using Thermoelectric elements, and can be cooled to -20 °C while using ISS water supply or -10 °C while only being air cooled. Resistive heating elements are used to provide an incubation capacity up to 48.5 °C.
- MERLIN contains temperature sensor connections inside the payload volume, for monitoring sample temperature, for up to 12 sensors.
- The internal sample volume is ~0.65 cubic feet (0.018 m^{3}).

== Additional Cold Stowage ==
MERLIN is one of multiple units available for storage on the ISS and/or transportation to and from the ISS.

- Minus Eighty Degree Laboratory Freezer for ISS (MELFI)
  - +4 °C to -80 °C
- GLACIER (General Laboratory Active Cryogenic ISS Experiment Refrigerator)
  - +4 °C to –160 °C
- Polar (Research Refrigerator for ISS)
  - +4 °C to -95 °C

== See also ==
- Scientific research on the ISS
- International Space Station
- SpaceX Dragon
