= Merlin (database) =

Merlin (Missing pERsons Linked INdicies)is a database run by the Metropolitan Police that stores information on children who have become known to the police for any reason. This can range from being a victim of bullying to being present whilst a property is searched, this may be with a warrant or under the Police and Criminal Evidence Act. It also holds data for missing persons. They can be of any age. Entries on the database can be accessed by police officers and civilian workers.

== See also ==
- ContactPoint
- Crimint
