= Merlyn Sopjan =

Indonesian transgender rights activist

Merlyn Sopjan (b. 16 February 1973) is an Indonesian transgender rights activist.

== Personal life and education ==
She was born on 16 February 1973 the last of four children to R. Soebijanto Wirjowijoyo and Rr. T. Ismundari. Raised as male, she felt her gender identity was female from the age of four. Although she tried to be attracted to women, she realized that she was attracted to men. Merlyn had her first relationship with a man when she was in high school, which led to her accidentally coming out to her mother after her mother read her love letter that shown that she had a relationship with a man. At first, her mother was shocked and crying, but she explain that it was her condition and finally her mother accepting her as her current gender. She is an alumnus for civil engineering degree from Institut Teknologi Nasional Malang.

Her mother dead on 1992 and she was coming out on 1994 to her father. Her father accept her and offered her to do gender-affirming surgery, but she refused and tell her father that he was comfortable with her current state. She joined beauty pageant contest for transgender women and selected transgender queen on 1995 which she got again on 1996 and 2006.

== Career ==
She was head of Ikatan Waria Malang, organization of transgender in Malang from 1996 till 2011. She worked as Program Manager for HIV/AIDS with her organization from 2002 till 2005 and then continued her work as a Case Manager at Public Hospital dr. Saiful Anwar, a state owned hospital located in Malang. Currently, she works as Program Officer for Perkumpulan Keluarga Berencana Indonesia, an organization that focused on implementation of Family planning. In 2003, she applied to be a candidates for governor in Malang, but was rejected cause she was five minutes late, though she he believes it was due to discrimination against her. On the same year, She was running as member of Malang City Regional House of Representatives with Indonesian Justice and Unity Party but come out in second position and failed to secure the seat.

== Controversy ==
She criticized Anang Hermansyah and Aurel Hermansyah as ungrateful people because they kept telling stories about their poor lifestyle that occurred after the divorce of Anang and Krisdayanti.

== Bibliography ==
- 2005: Jangan Lihat Kelaminku – published in the Indonesia by Galang Press.
- 2007:Perempuan Tanpa V – published in the Indonesia by Galang Press.
